= Graues Haus (Oestrich-Winkel) =

National heritage site

Coordinates: 49°59′49″N 8°00′27″E

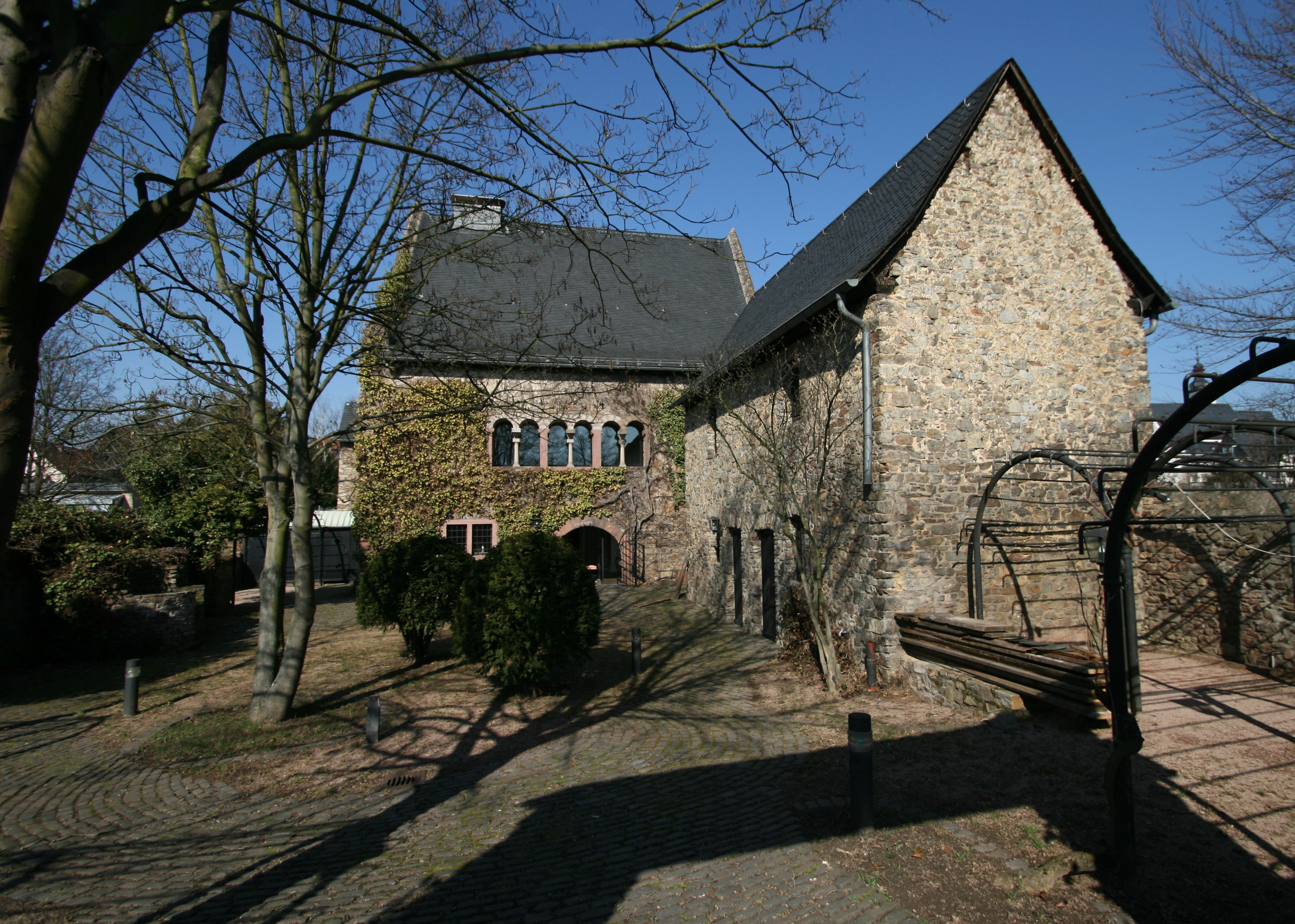
Graues Haus in Winkel

Graues Haus (literally: The Grey House) is a Romanesque house in Winkel in the Rheingau, Germany. It is assumed that it was erected in the late tenth century and is therefore among the oldest stone houses in Germany.

== Location ==
The house is located at Graugasse 8 in the south of the town towards the Rhine. Today the building is surrounded by vineyards. It is separated from the river since the Bundesstraße 42 (federal highway 42) was built in the 1950s.

== History ==
An exact dating of the origin of the building is problematic. Dendrochronological studies of the roof timbers show that these were struck around 1075/1078. For the construction, spoliae dated back to the ninth to eleventh century were used, probably from the nearby imperial palace at Ingelheim am Rhein.

Older theories assumed that the building was erected already in the ninth century, and was the home and place of death of the archbishop and scholar Rabanus Maurus. According to current research, the house was built as a family residence of the Greiffenclau family, the heirs of the Lords of Winkel, whose pedigree can be traced back to the year 1097. The building served until the year 1330 as a residence and then as a house for employees of Schloss Vollrads.

Over the centuries, the building was kept virtually unchanged. In the seventeenth century a neighboring building was added on the south side. After a fire in 1964, the house was reconstructed from 1966 to 1967 to its old form by the then-owner, Count Erwein Matuschka-Greiffenclau, supported by the state of Hesse, the Rheingau-Taunus-Kreis and the town of Oestrich-Winkel.

== Literature ==
- Folkhard Cremer (editor): Handbuch der deutschen Kunstdenkmäler. Hessen II. Regierungsbezirk Darmstadt. Deutscher Kunstverlag, München 2008, ISBN 978-3-422-03117-3, p. 835 and 836.
