= Ludwig Becker (architect) =

German architect (1855–1940)

Ludwig Becker (19 November 1855 – 13 July 1940) was a German architect.

== Life ==
Becker was born the son of the eponymous Cologne master craftsman and master builder. He studied from 1873 at the Technical University of Aachen and was trained in addition to the stonemason and sculptor at the Cologne Dombauhütte. In Mainz he was named church master builder (Kirchenbaumeister) in 1884, and cathedral master builder (Dombaumeister) from 1909 to 1940. After 1909 he partnered with Anton Falkowski, and later with his son, the church architect Hugo Becker (1897–1967).

Becker also worked as a construction researcher at the Mainz Cathedral, who brought important findings to light; however, his conclusions were flawed. His thesis was that the construction of the Mainz Cathedral was already begun in Constantine the Great's time in the 4th century, but he could not convincingly demonstrate the claim, which was unanimously rejected by experts.

Becker's grave is in Mainz's main cemetery.

== Work ==
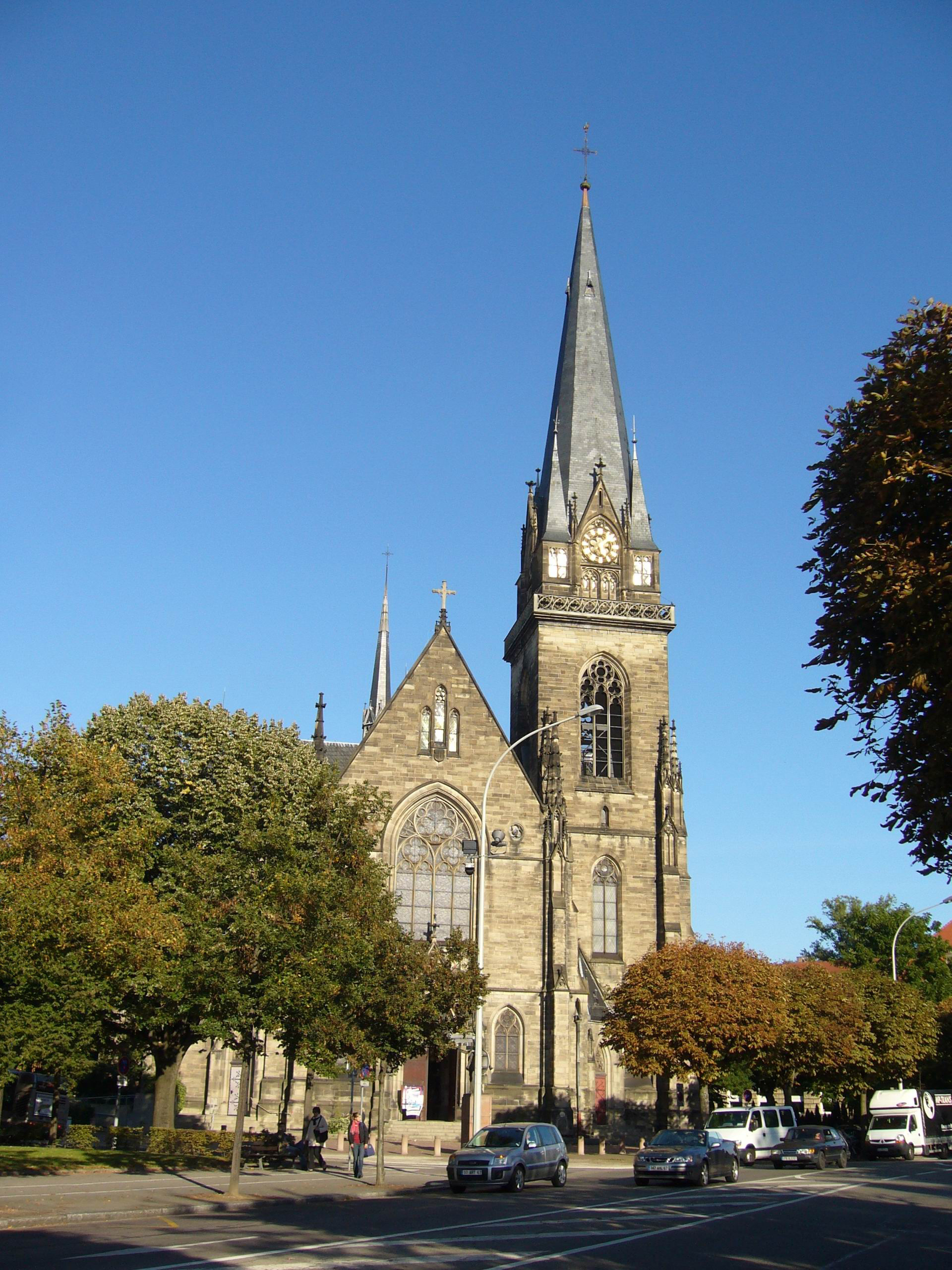
St Maurice's Church in Strasbourg

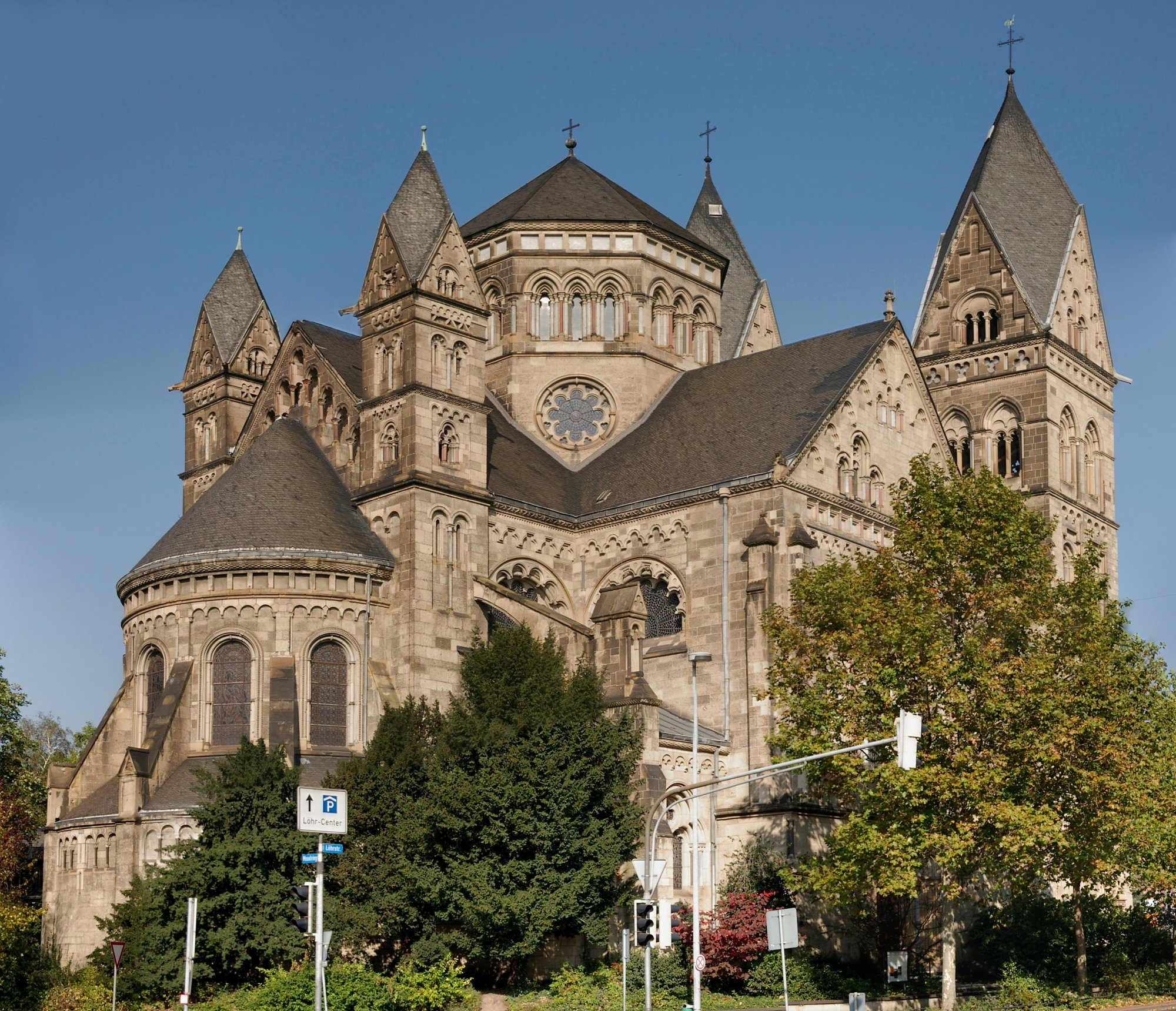
Herz-Jesu-Kirche in Koblenz

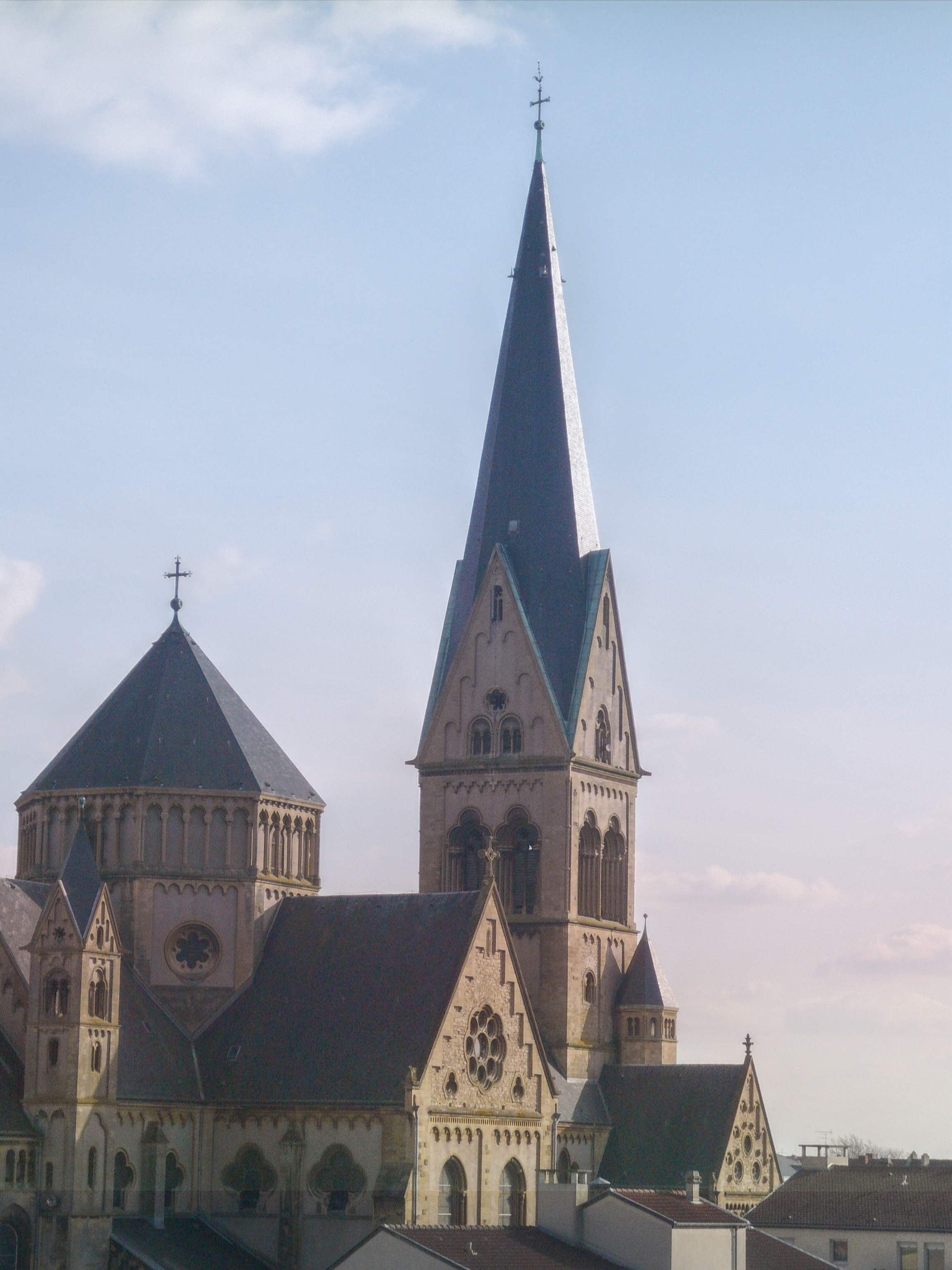
St. Joseph in Montigny-lès-Metz

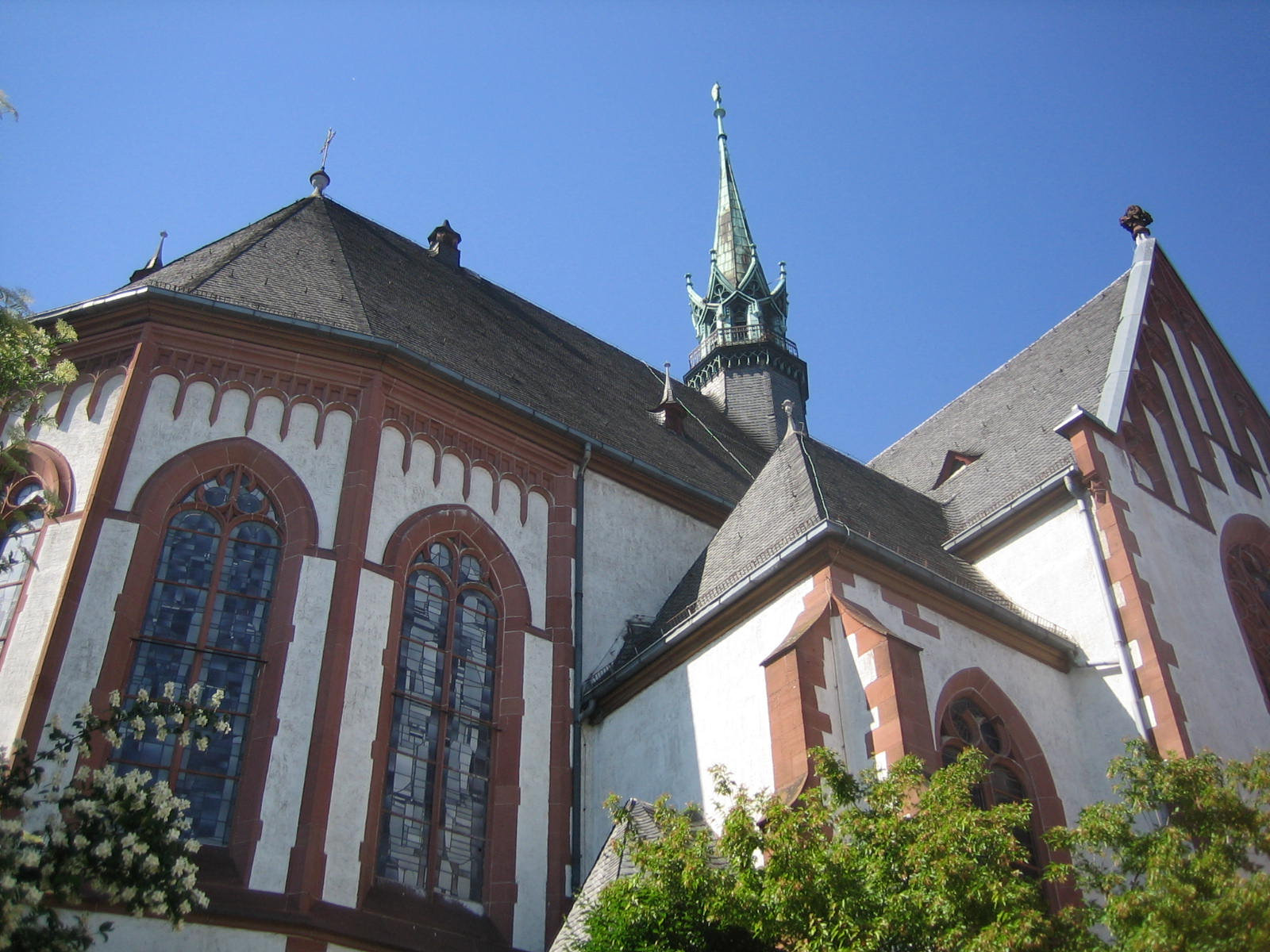
Herz-Jesu-Kirche, Mainz

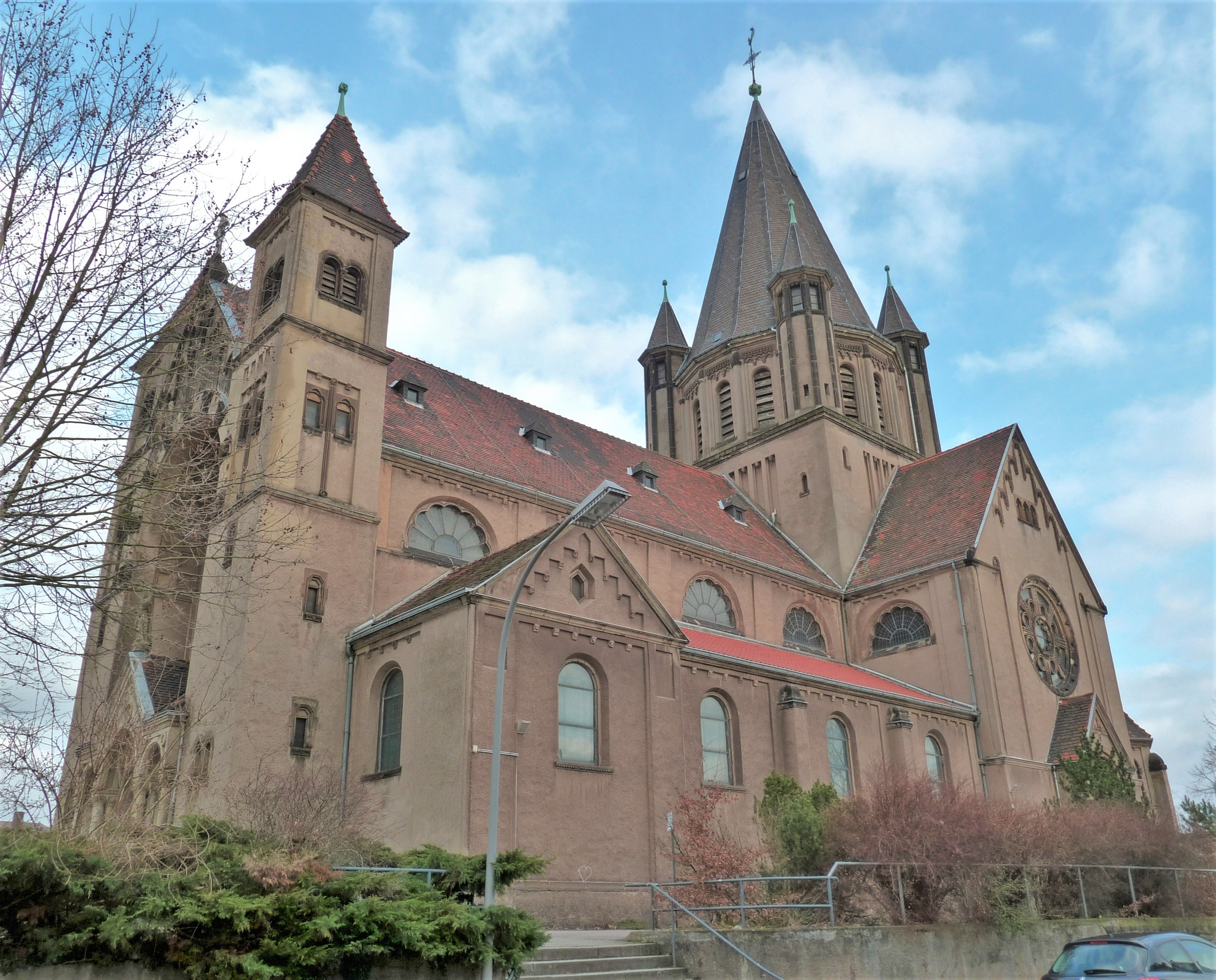
Herz-Jesu-Kirche in Saarbrücken

Becker dealt with over 300 churches, which he restored, rebuilt or built. He used numerous styles of various historical architectural styles, as is customary in historicism. He designed many buildings together with his business partner Anton Falkowski. Becker and Falkowski preferred Romanesque and Gothic before the First World War, then simple baroque. From about 1930, expressionist stylistic devices were also used.

- Catholic parish Church of the Assumption in Kirrberg, 1881–1893
- Catholic parish Church of St. Mary in Bad Homburg before the height, designed in 1889, executed 1892–1895
- Catholic parish Church of St. Joseph in St. Ingbert, 1890–1893
- Catholic parish Church of St. Martin in Oestrich (restoration), 1890–1893
- Tomb chapel of the family Wambolt of Umstadt in the castle Birkenau (Odenwald), 1891
- Catholic garrison Church St. Mauritius in Strasbourg, Arnoldsplatz, competition 1893, completed 1899
- Catholic parish Church of St. Bartholomew in Zornheim, 1893–1894
- Catholic parish Church of St. Mary's Conception in Düsseldorf, 1894–1896
- Catholic parish Church of the Holy Cross in Bad Kreuznach, Wilhelmstraße, 1895–1897
- Catholic parish Church of St. Rochus in Kaiserslautern-Hohenecken, 1896–1897
- Catholic parish Church of St. Michael in Unter-Hambach (Heppenheim), 1897–1899
- Catholic parish Church of St. Lawrence in Bobenheim, 1898
- Catholic parish Church of St. Matthew in Bad Sobernheim, 1898–1899
- Episcopal Convict in Bensheim, 1899–1900
- Catholic parish Church of the Sacred Heart in Bad Kreuznach-Planig, 1900
- Catholic parish Church of St. Lutwinus in Mettlach, 1899–1902
- Catholic parish Church of St. Agatha in Altenhundem (with Wilhelm Sunder-Plassmann), 1900–1901
- Catholic parish Church of St. Hubertus in Nonnweiler, 1900–1902
- Catholic parish Church of St. Bernard in Clausen, 1900–1903
- Catholic parish Church of the Sacred Heart in Koblenz, Löhrrondell, 1900–1903
- Catholic parish Church of St. Peter in Heppenheim (Bergstraße), Kirchgasse, 1900–1904
- Catholic parish Church of St. Joseph in Hagen, 1901–1906
- Catholic parish Church of St. Fridolin in Mulhouse, 1901–1906
- Catholic parish Church of St. Joseph in Montigny-lès-Metz, 1901–1906 (inauguration 29 July 1906)
- Artisan house in Art Nouveau style on the Märtmannstrasse in Dortmund-Aplerbeck 1902–1904
- Catholic parish Church of St. Boniface in Neuenkirchen (Oldenburg), 1902–1905 (with Wilhelm Sunder-Plassmann)
- Catholic parish Church of St. Pankratius in Buldern (with Wilhelm Sunder-Plassmann)
- Catholic parish Church of St. Lawrence in Sommerau in the Spessart, 1902 to about 1906. The reconstruction and expansion planning was not realized in favor of a new building.
- Tower of the Catholic parish Church of St. Lucia in Harsewinkel, 1903–1904 with Wilhelm Sunder-Plaßmann, Münster
- Catholic parish Church of St. Wendelin in Zellhausen (Mainhausen), 1903/04
- Catholic parish Church of St. Elizabeth in Darmstadt, 1903–1905
- Catholic parish church of St. Boniface in Giessen, 1903–1936
- Catholic Church of St. Boniface in Bad Nauheim, 1904/05
- Catholic parish Church of St. Bartholomew in Kirschhausen (Heppenheim), 1904/05
- Transept and double tower facade of the Catholic parish Church of St. Brigida in Legden, 1905
- Longhouse and double tower facade of the Catholic parish Church of St. Stephan in Mainz-Gonsenheim, 1905–1906
- Catholic parish church St. Martinus in Hattersheim am Main, 1915
- Catholic parish Church of St. Theresia in Rhens.
