= Oestrich-Winkel =

- Town
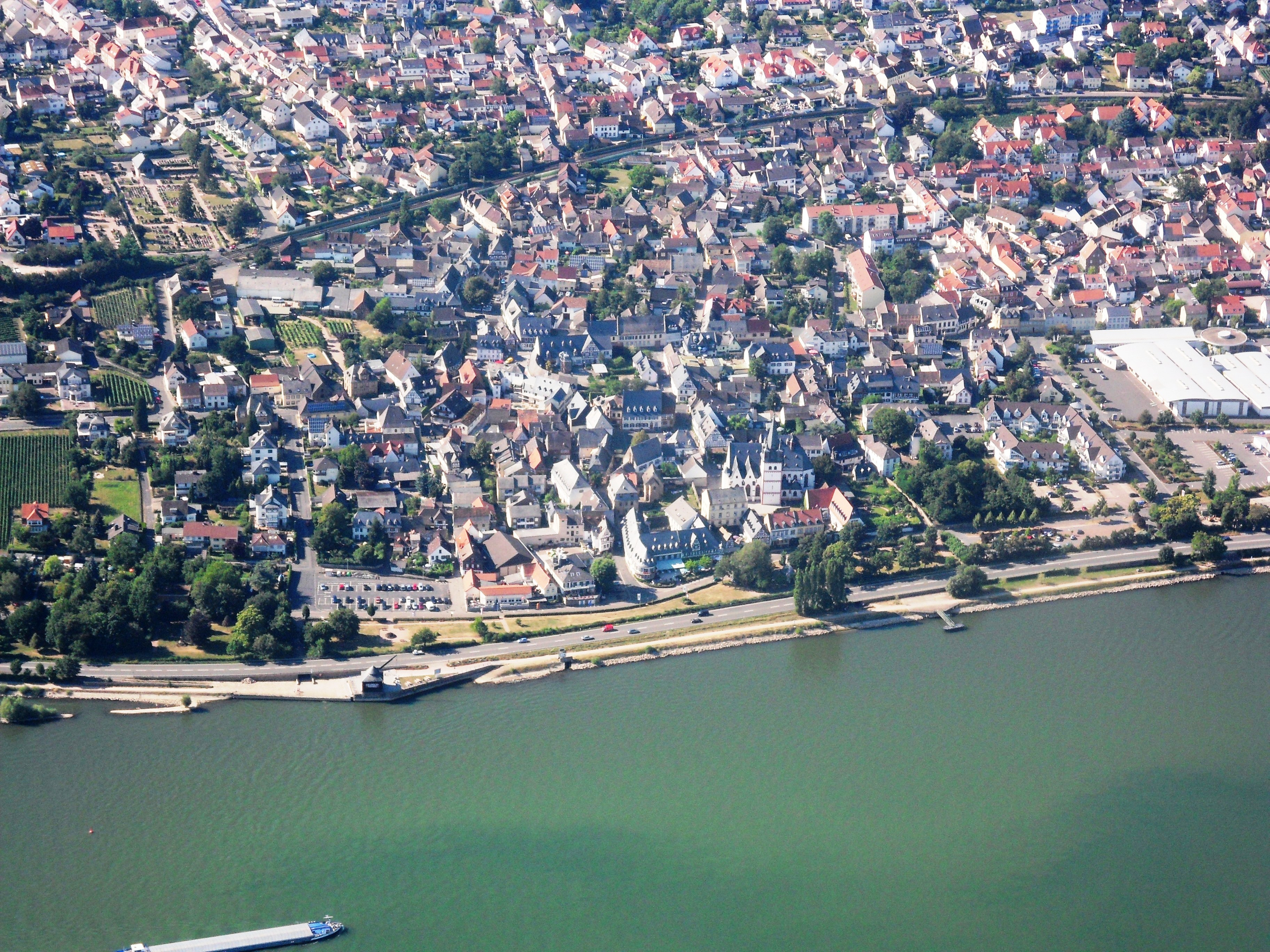
- Aerial view of Oestrich and Rhine river

- Coat of arms

- Location of Oestrich-Winkel within Rheingau-Taunus-Kreis district
- Interactive map of Oestrich-Winkel
- Location within Germany Location within Hesse
- Coordinates: 50°00′09″N 8°01′03″E
- Country: Germany
- State: Hesse
- Admin. region: Darmstadt
- District: Rheingau-Taunus-Kreis

Government
  - Mayor (2024–29): Carsten Sinß (SPD)

Area
  - Total: 59.51 km^{2} (22.98 sq mi)
- Elevation: 84 m (276 ft)

Population (2025-12-31)
  - Total: 11,386
  - Density: 191.3/km^{2} (495.5/sq mi)
- Time zone: UTC+01:00 (CET)
  - Summer (DST): UTC+02:00 (CEST)
- Postal codes: 65375
- Dialling codes: 06723
- Vehicle registration: RÜD, SWA
- Website: www.oestrich-winkel.de

Oestrich-Winkel (German pronunciation: [ˈøːstʁɪç ˈvɪŋkl̩]) is a town with roughly 12,000 inhabitants in the Rheingau-Taunus-Kreis in the Regierungsbezirk of Darmstadt in Hesse, Germany.

== Geography ==
=== Location ===
Oestrich-Winkel, which culturally belongs to the Rheingau region, lies on the Rhine River, 19 km west-southwest of Wiesbaden and 17 km west of Mainz. It is, as a part of the Rheingau wine region, the largest winegrowing town of Hesse.

The coordinates 50°N, 8°E lie right in the stadtteil of Winkel, whose name, coincidentally, is German for “angle”.

=== Neighbouring municipalities ===
Oestrich-Winkel borders in the north on the town of Lorch and the municipalities of Welterod (Rhein-Lahn-Kreis in Rhineland-Palatinate), Heidenrod and Schlangenbad; in the east on the town of Eltville; in the south, across the Rhine, on the town of Ingelheim (Mainz-Bingen district in Rhineland-Palatinate) and in the west on the town of Geisenheim.

=== Territorial structure ===
Oestrich-Winkel as a municipality consists of four Stadtteile:

- Hallgarten
- Mittelheim
- Oestrich (seat of municipal administration)
- Winkel

Hallgarten as the only one of these has the status as an Ortsbezirk.

== History ==
Oestrich-Winkel was founded on the 1st of July, 1972 by the merger of the municipalities of Mittelheim, Oestrich and Winkel; it was further enlarged by incorporation of Hallgarten in 1977 by law. From the very beginning Oestrich-Winkel was entitled by state government to lead the designation Stadt (town).

The double-barrelled name Oestrich-Winkel has already had a long tradition as the name of the only train station for the East Rhine Railway between Geisenheim and Hattenheim.

== Politics ==
=== Mayors ===
Carsten Sinß (SPD) was elected in 2023 for mayor. Former mayors were:

- 2019–2023: Kay Tenge (CDU)
- 2013–2019: Michael Heil (CDU)
- 1995–2013: Paul Weimann (CDU)
- 1989–1995: Heinz-Dieter Mielke (SPD)
- 1972–1989: Klaus Frietsch (SPD)

=== Town council ===
The last municipal elections, taking place every five years, yielded the following results:

Parties and voter communities		% 2021	Seats 2021	% 2016	Seats 2016	% 2011	Seats 2011	% 2006	Seats 2006	% 2001	Seats 2001
CDU	Christian Democratic Union of Germany	36,1	11	44,6	14	37,9	14	43,4	16	47,9	18
SPD	Social Democratic Party of Germany	34,8	11	30,7	9	29,7	11	29.6	11	31.1	11
GREENS	Bündnis 90/Die Grünen	18,4	6	14,9	5	25,4	9	19.1	7	10.8	4
FDP	Free Democratic Party	10,6	3	9,8	3	7,0	3	7.9	3	4.3	2
FWG	Freie Wählergemeinschaft	–	–	–	–	–	–	–	–	6.0	2
Total		100.0	31	100.0	31	100.0	37	100.0	37	100.0	37
Voter turnout in %		60,2		55,5		52,8		51.5		60.2	

=== Town partnerships ===
The town of Oestrich-Winkel maintains partnerships with the following two places and one military unit:

- Tokaj, Borsod-Abaúj-Zemplén County, Hungary
- Denicé, Rhône, France
- (Germany) 2./ Fernmeldebataillon 283 (roughly, “signal corps”) in Lahnstein.

=== Coat of arms ===
The town's arms might be described thus: Gules a Z reversed with cross stroke argent between two mullets of six Or.

The Z is a variant of a common German heraldic charge known in German as a Wolfsangel or Doppelhaken, and its appearance here apparently refers to its use for dealing with wolves in earlier times (the Wolfsangel is believed to have been used as a wolf trap). The arms themselves go back to the 17th century.

== Culture and sightseeing ==
=== Wine culture ===
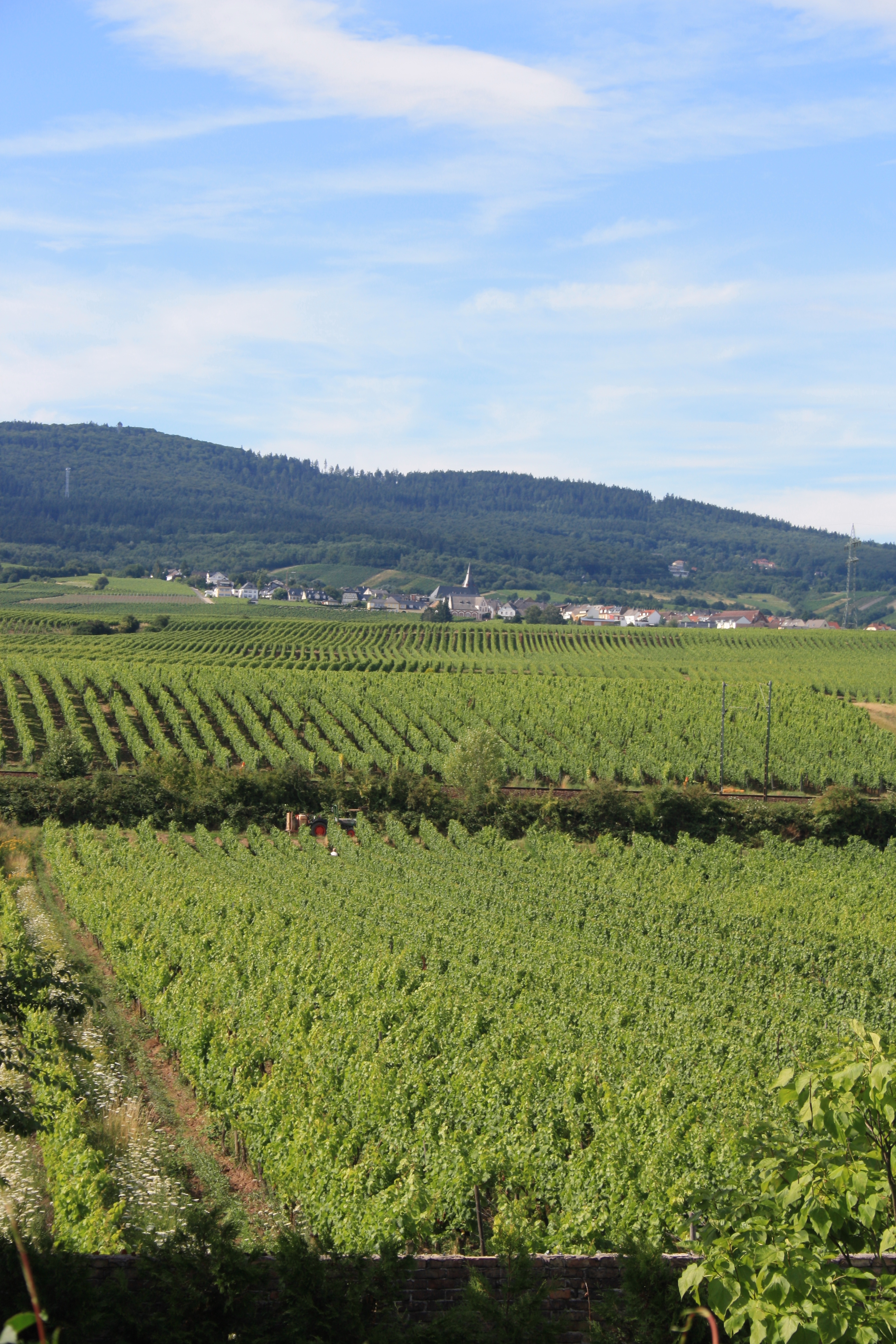
Weingut H. T. Eser in Oestrich-Winkel

Oestrich-Winkel is characterized by winegrowing. The following places are cultivated:

- Oestrich: Lenchen, Doosberg, Klosterberg, Pfaffenberg
- Mittelheim: Edelmann, St. Nikolaus, Goldberg
- Winkel: Dachsberg, Hasensprung, Gutenberg, Jesuitengarten, Bienengarten, Schloß Vollrads
- Hallgarten: Jungfer, Würzgarten, Schönhell, Hendelberg, Mehrhölzchen

=== Sightseeing ===
The Oestricher Kran, Oestrich-Winkel's main landmark, is a former wine-loading crane from the 18th century for loading and unloading ships. Completed in 1745, it was working until 1926. Inside the crane are two treadmills in each of which two men used their body weight to work a winch, which could then lift loads onto or off ships. It is the last preserved wine-loading crane on the Rhine's right bank. There were once also such cranes in Lorch, Eltville and Rüdesheim. These cranes can still be found in existence along the Rhine at Andernach (stone; loaded tuff, millstones and wine barrels) and Bingen (wood, loaded mainly wine barrels).

In Mittelheim is found one of Germany's oldest stone churches, St.-Aegidius-Basilika (“Saint Giles’s Basilica”).

In Winkel stands Germany's oldest stone house, the Graues Haus (“Grey House”). For a long time it was believed that Rabanus Maurus lived and in 856 died there. Schloss Vollrads, outside Winkel, with its ancient watertower likewise belongs among the noteworthy sights. On the town's northeast limit near Hattenheim stands Schloss Reichartshausen (founded in the 12th century) with its outbuildings, which about 1900 were remodelled to look like follies. It nowadays houses the European Business School. In the middle of the community stands the Brentanohaus. Here, Goethe spent some time in 1814 as a guest of the Frankfurt banking family Brentano. The family's children were Clemens, Gunda and Bettina Brentano. Karoline von Günderrode, a poet and one of Bettina's friends, stabbed herself here in Winkel in 1806 on the Rhine's bank out of lovesickness and life weariness. Since 2003, the barn across from the Brentanohaus has hosted the cultural and event venue Brentanoscheune (Scheune means “barn”).

Oestrich-Winkel

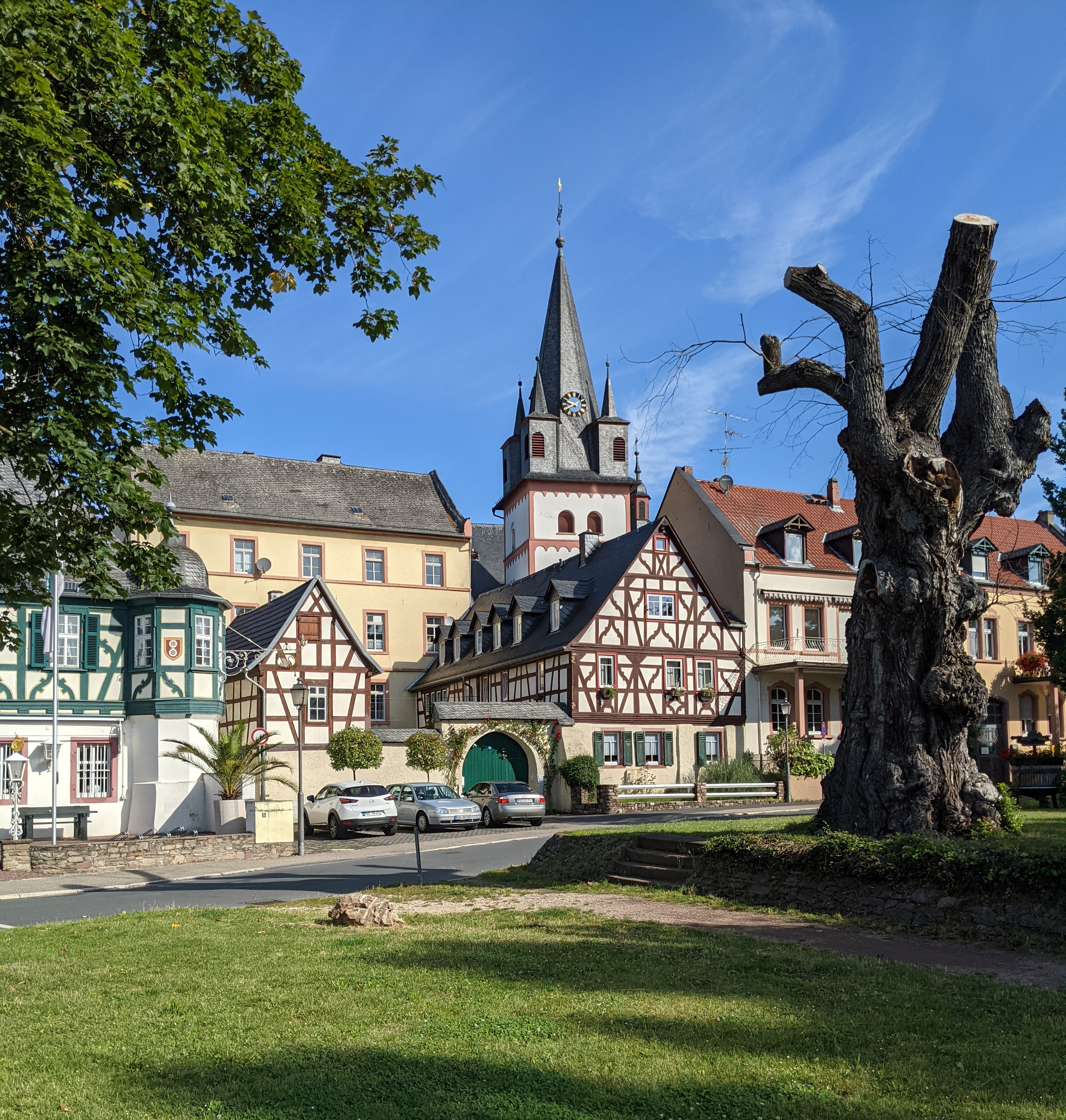
St. Martin, Oestrich

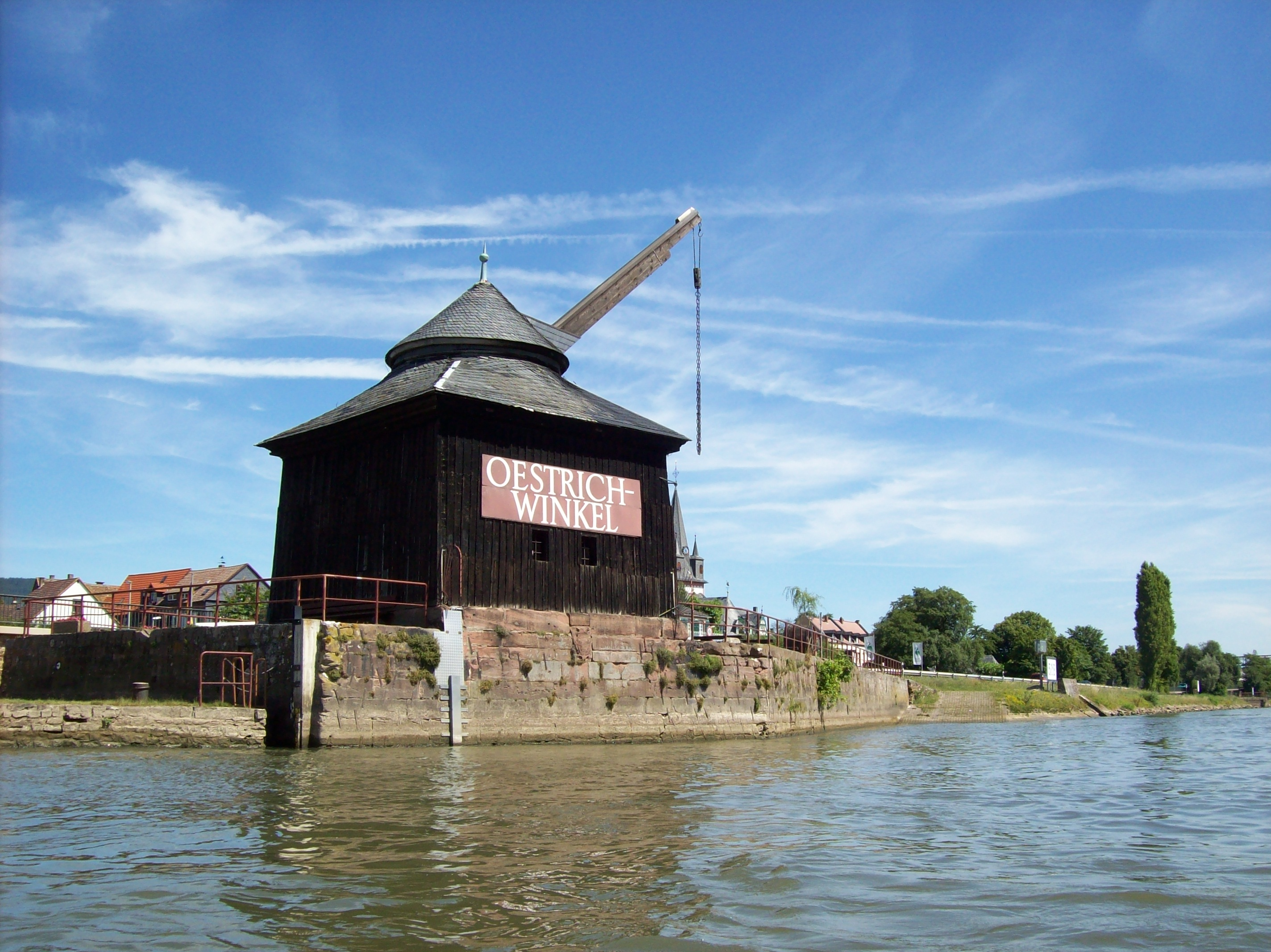
Oestrich Crane

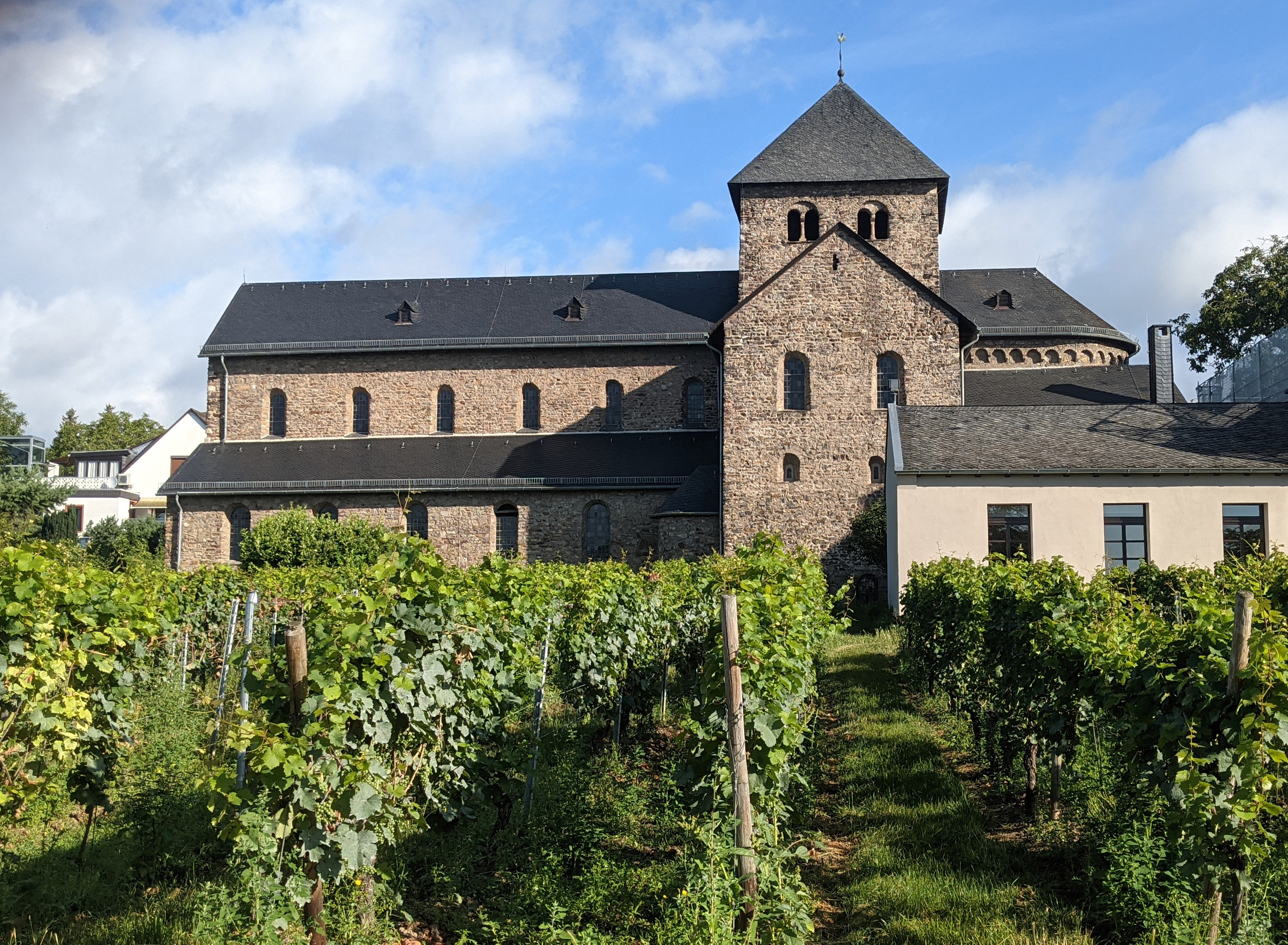
Saint Giles’s Basilica

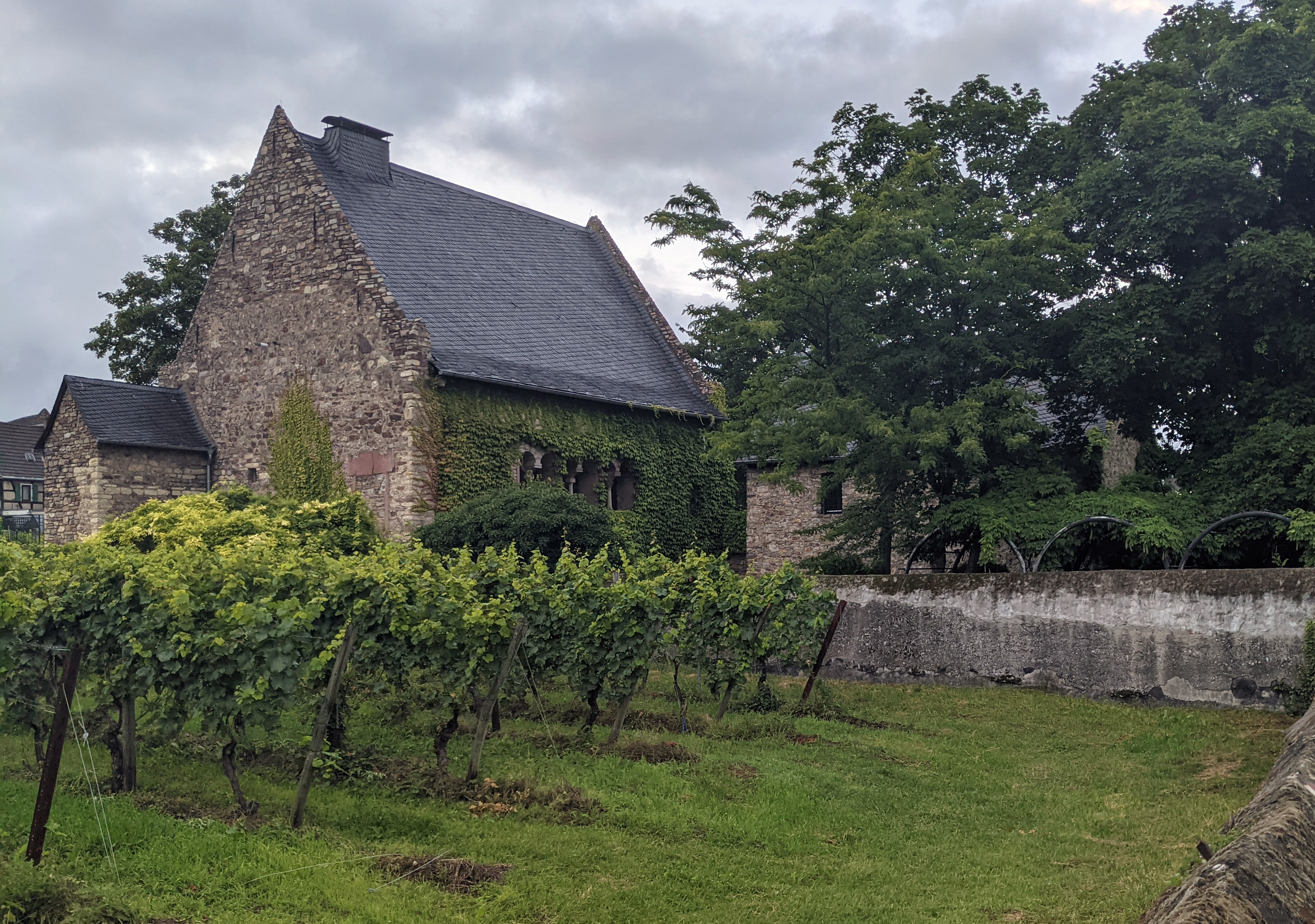
Grey House

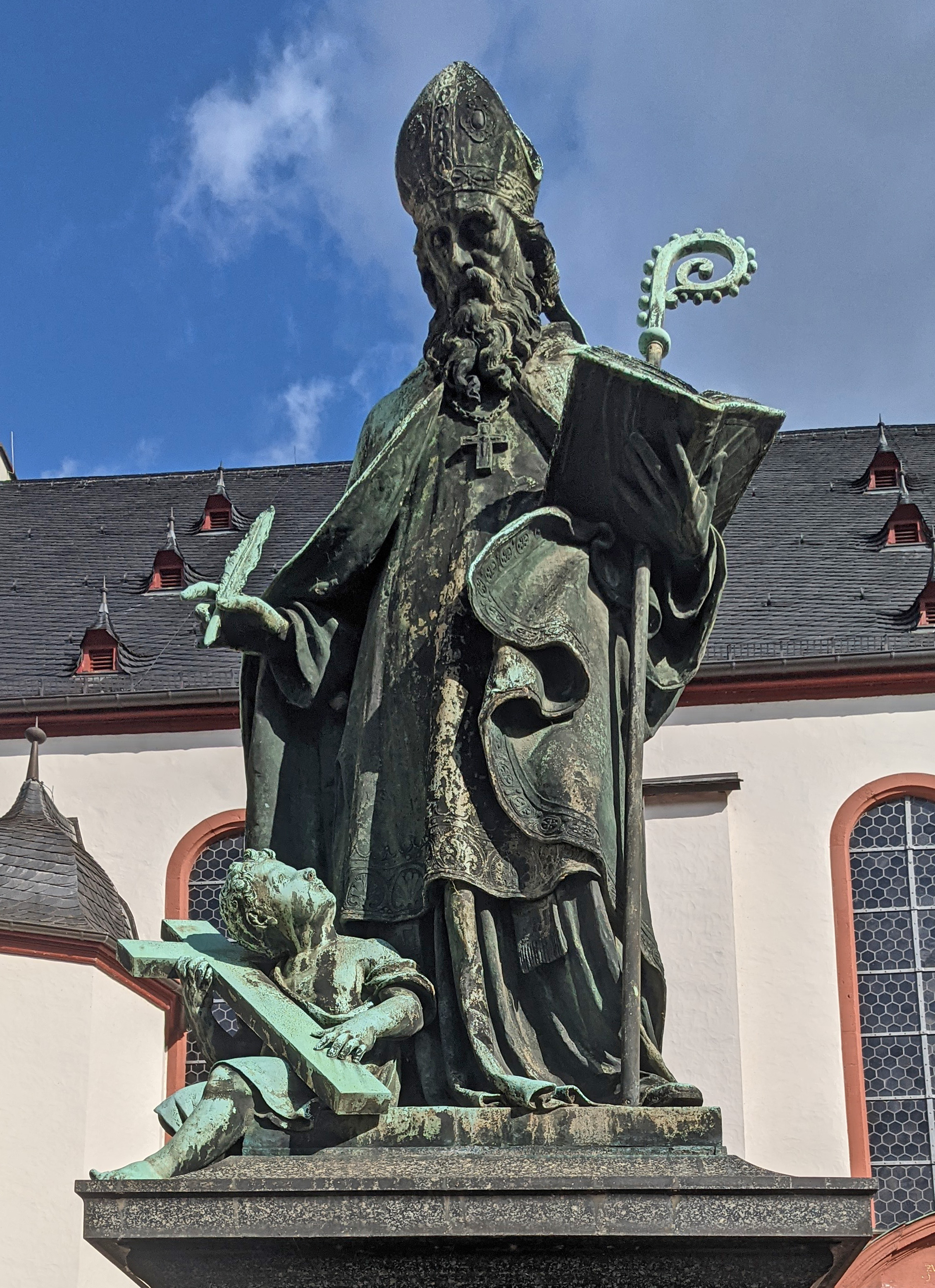
Rabanus Maurus memorial

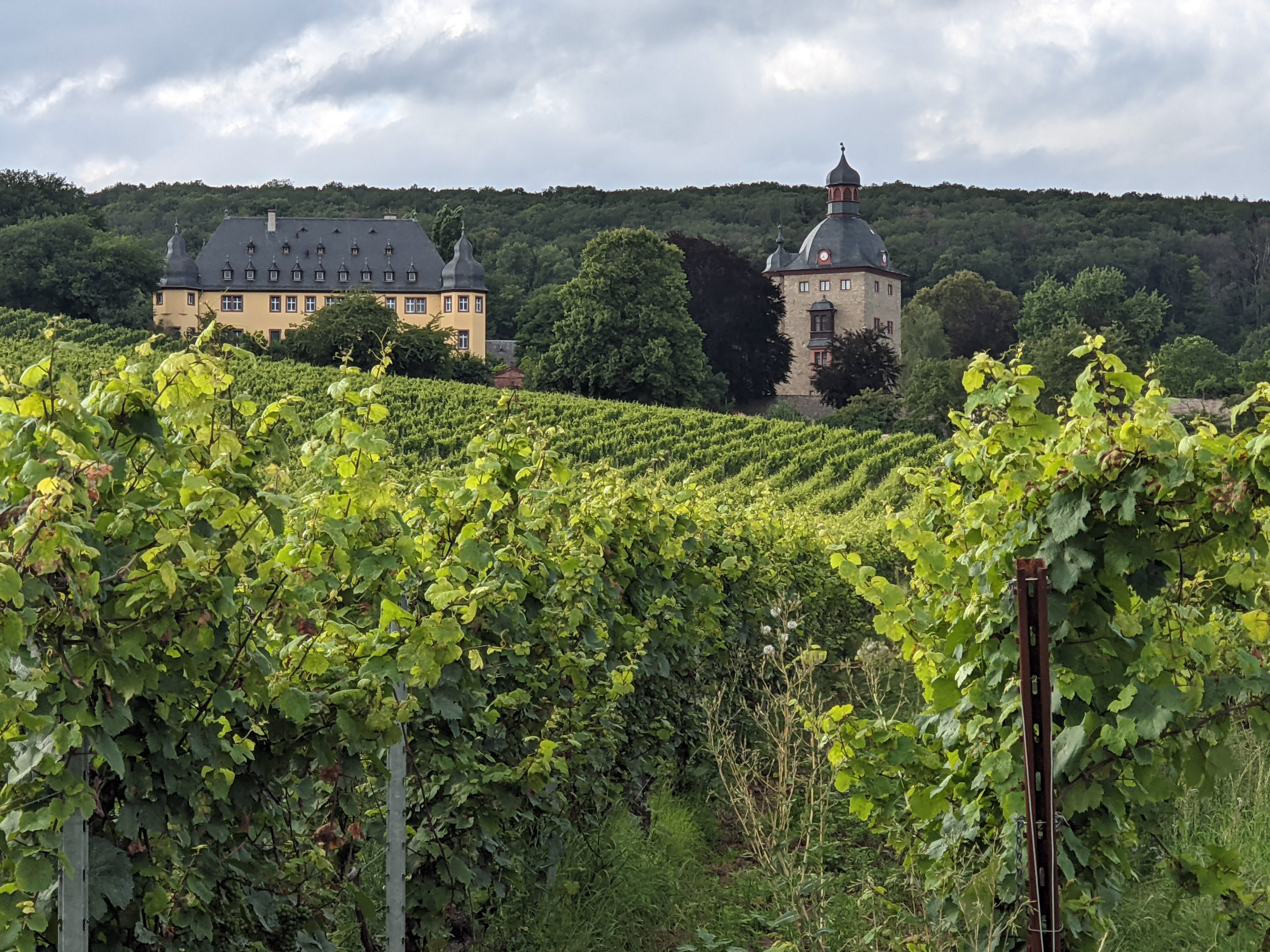
Schloss Vollrads

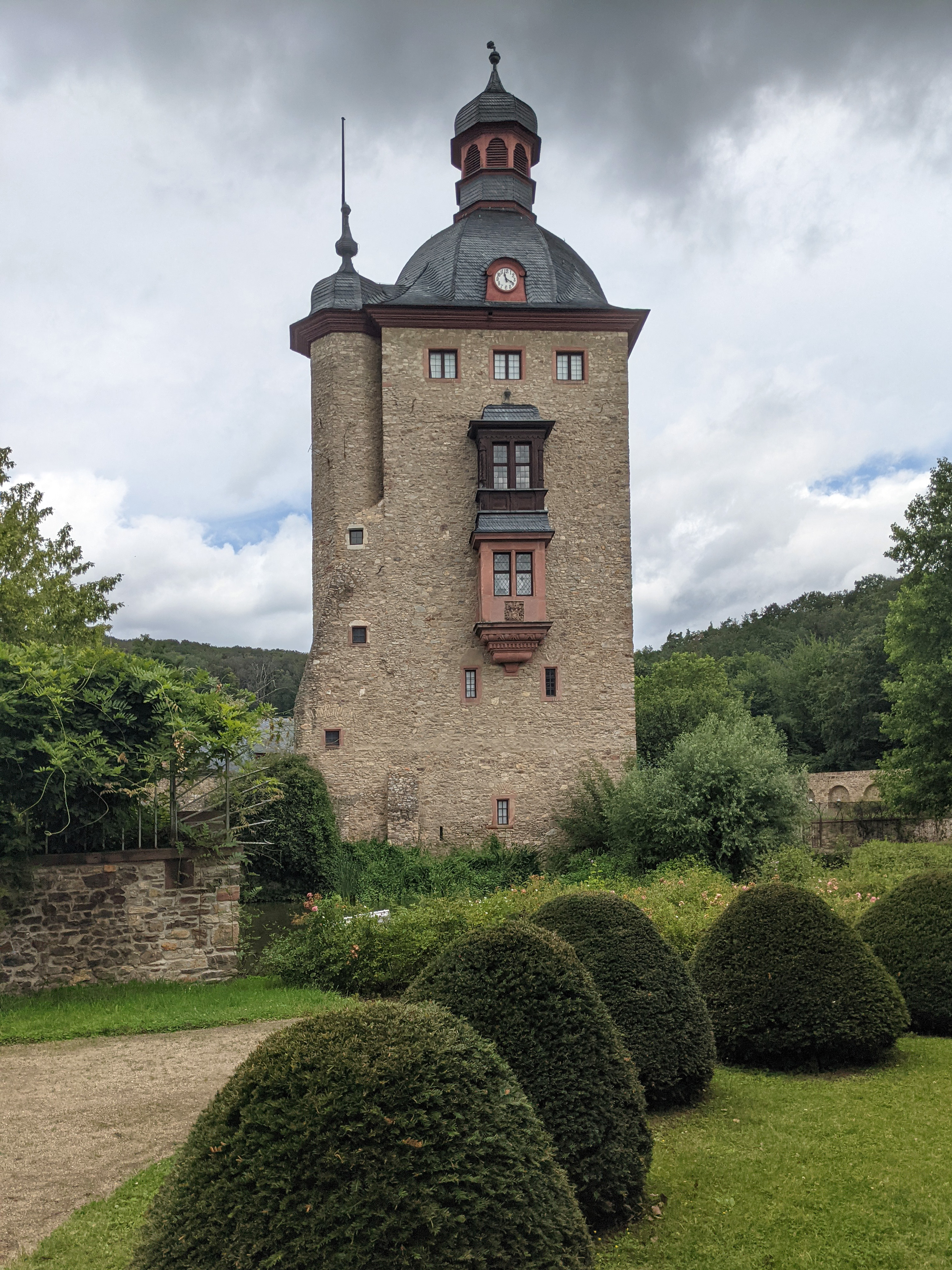
Schloss Vollrads tower

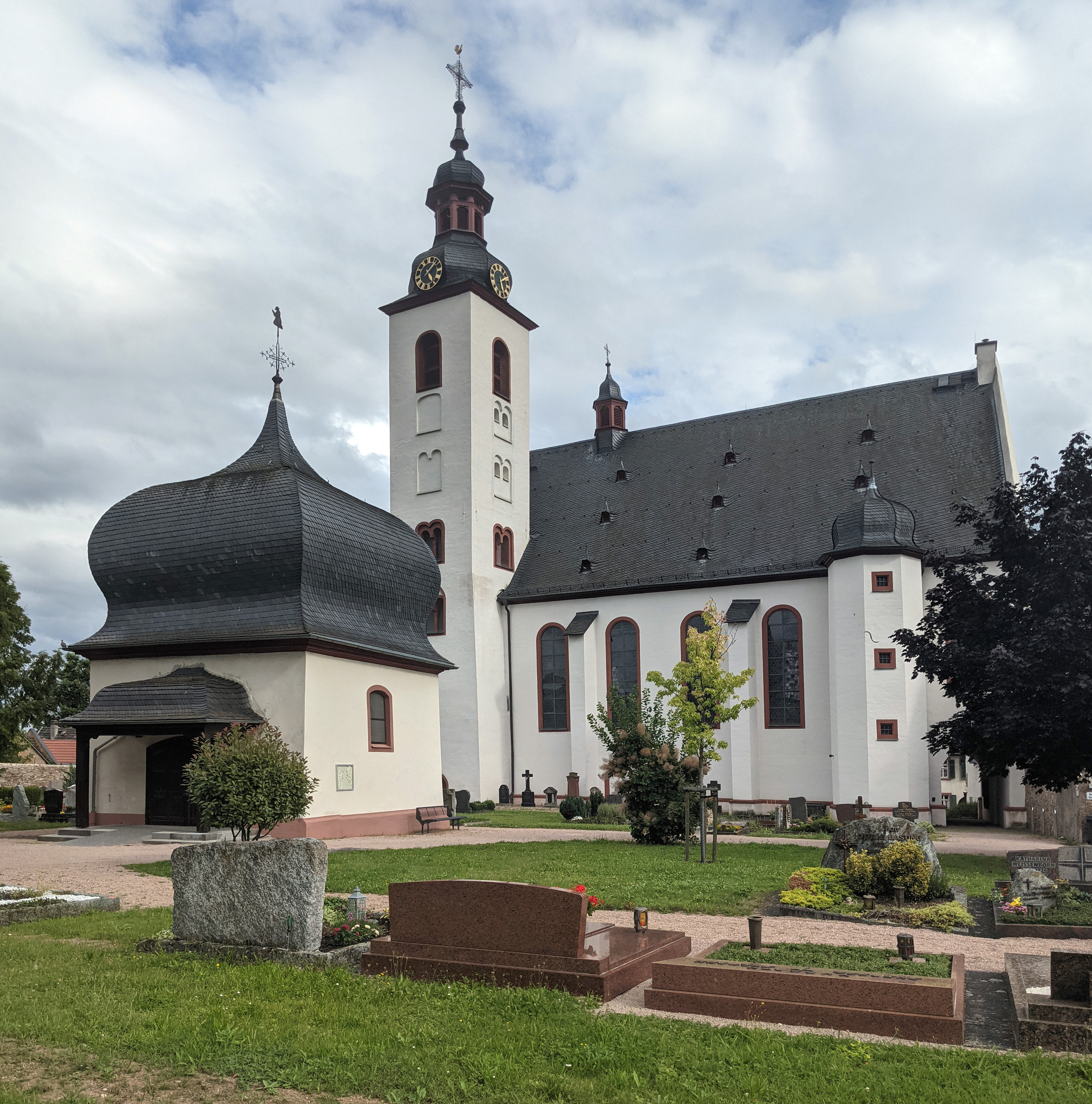
Church of St. Walburga

=== Regular events ===
These include the Lenchenfest (a wine festival), the Dippemarkt (a market with a funfair the Christmas market (Weihnachtsmarkt) and Jazz Week (Jazzwoche).

=== Rheingau Musik Festival ===
The Rheingau Musik Festival has its office in Oestrich in a former winery, the presshouse (Kelterhalle) converted to a hall for intimitate concerts and events. Festival concerts have taken place in the basilica St. Aegidius, such as a recital of Elisabeth Scholl.

== Economy and infrastructure ==
=== Education ===
Since 1980 Oestrich-Winkel has been the seat of the EBS Universität für Wirtschaft und Recht. Further educational institutions are, among others, the Clemens-Brentano-Schule (primary school and Hauptschule), the Rabanus-Maurus-Schule (primary school and Hauptschule with orientation level) and Hallgarten primary school.

=== Transport ===
Oestrich-Winkel lies right on Bundesstraße 42, which is particularly well developed towards the east, and which seamlessly feeds into the A 66 near Wiesbaden. The town lies on the Frankfurt am Main–Wiesbaden–Oestrich-Winkel–Koblenz railway line and belongs to the Rhein-Main-Verkehrsverbund. Furthermore, between 6:00 and 21:00, a ferry shuttles across the Rhine between Mittelheim and Ingelheim, where there is a link with the A 60.

== Famous people ==
=== Sons and daughters of the town ===
- Richard von Greiffenklau zu Vollrads (1467–1531), Archbishop and Elector of Trier, was born at Schloss Vollrads
- Peter Spahn (1846–1925), German politician (ZENTRUM), Member of the Reichstag, Member of the Landtag (Prussia), Prussian Justice Minister, was born in Winkel

=== Others with links to the town ===
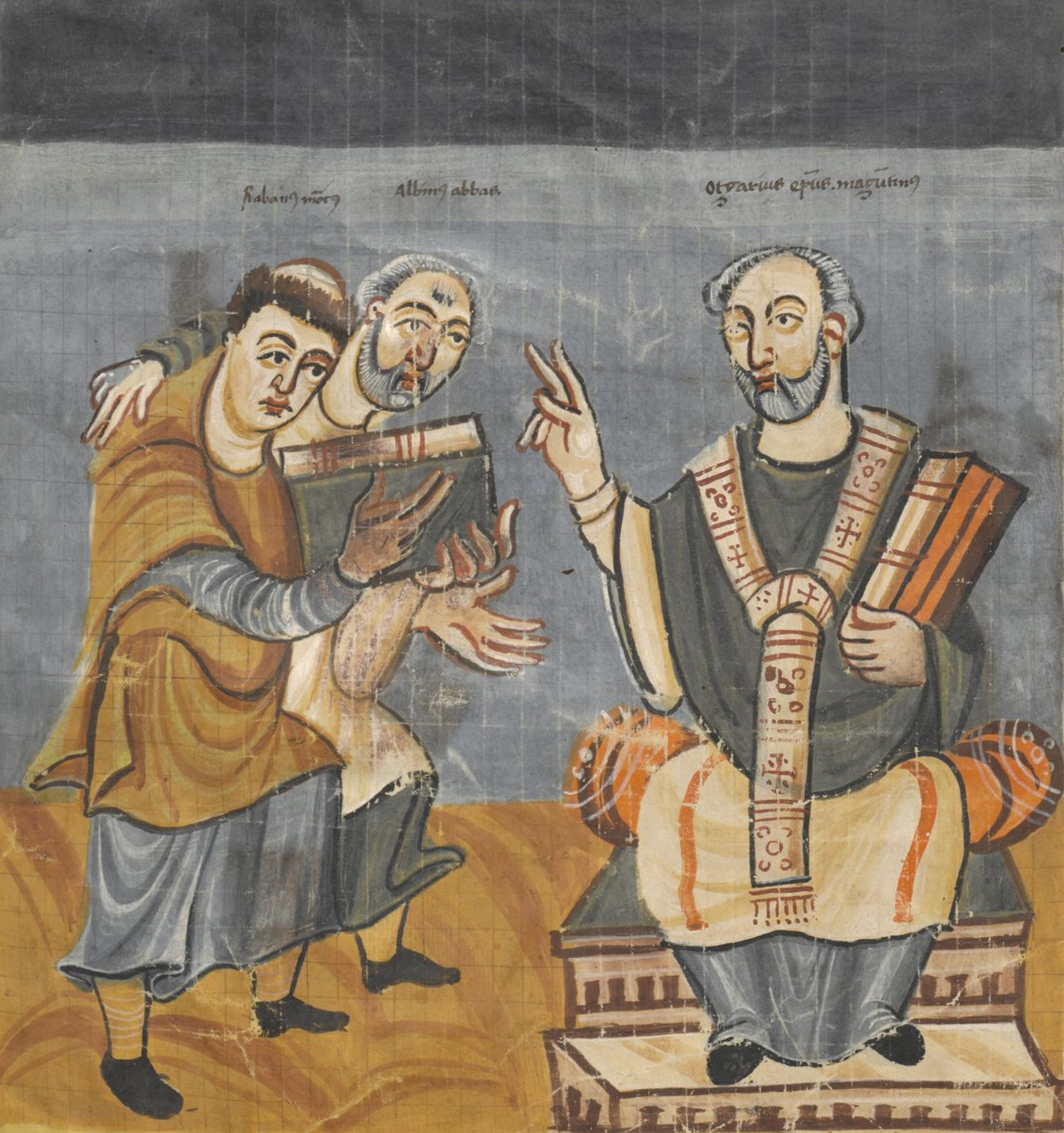
Rabanus Maurus, left, Alcuin, center, Martin of Tours (right)

- Rabanus Maurus (d. 856), important Carolingian academic, died in Winkel
- Karoline von Günderrode (1780–1806), Romantic poet, committed suicide in Winkel
- Andreas Joseph Hofmann, (1752–1849), Metternich's teacher, revolutionary, France's agent in London, and in 1793 German history's first Parliamentary president in the Rhenish-German National Convention
- Hellmuth Heye, (1895–1970), vice admiral in World War II, died in Winkel
