= Rheingau (wine region) =

German wine region

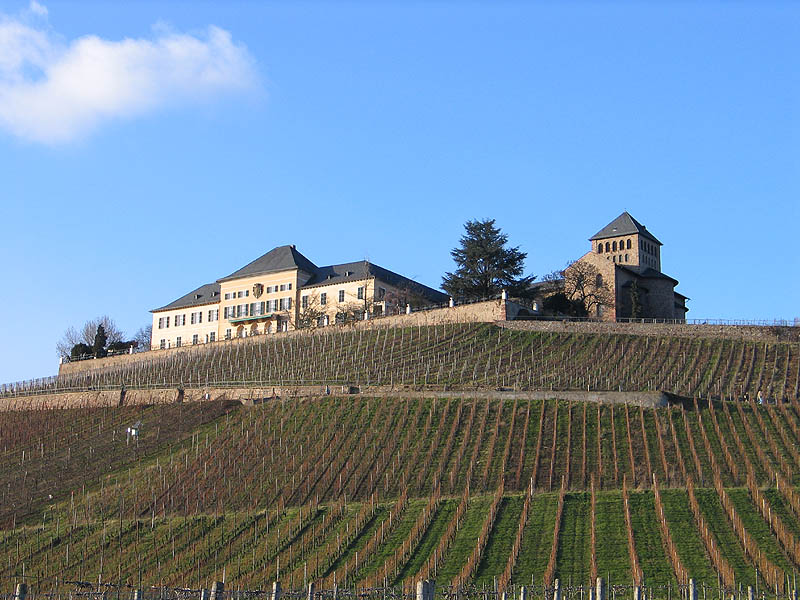
Schloss Johannisberg is one of the best known historical important domaines in Germany. It is famous as an early adopter of the Riesling grape varietal, and as the site where the German form of noble rot was discovered by accident.

Rheingau (German pronunciation: [ˈʁaɪnɡaʊ]) is one of 13 designated German wine regions (Weinbaugebiete) producing quality wines (QbA and Prädikatswein). It was named after the traditional region of Rheingau (meaning "Rhine district"), the wine region is situated in the state of Hesse, where it constitutes part of the Rheingau-Taunus-Kreis administrative district. Although making up only 3 percent of the total German vineyard area, Rheingau has been the source of many historically important innovations in German wine making, and contains many wine producers of international reputation, such as Schloss Johannisberg. Rheingau, with 3,125 hectares (7,720 acres) of vineyards in 2016, also boasts a higher proportion of Riesling (77.7%) than any other German wine-growing region, with Spätburgunder (Pinot noir) making up most of the rest (12.2%), followed by Müller-Thurgau.

== Geography and terroir ==
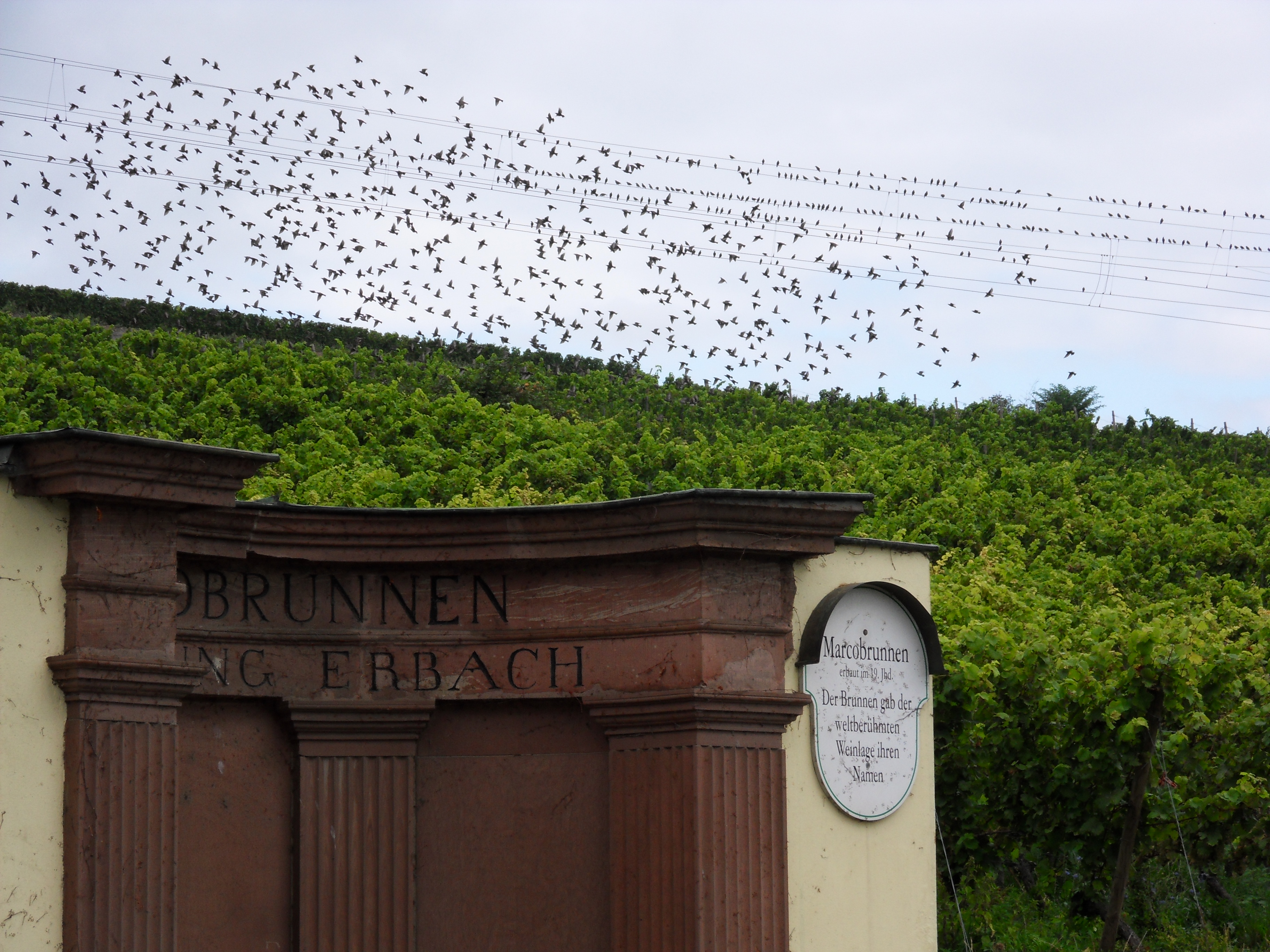
Erbacher Marcobrunn, surrounded by vineyards

The geography of the Rheingau is very distinct. Around Wiesbaden, the river Rhine detours from its northward flow west for about 30 km before it flows north again. The greater part of the Rheingau is situated here on the river's right bank, but the region also includes the stretch along Rhine after it turns northward again, around the villages Assmannshausen and Lorch. The vineyards in Hochheim on the Main river are also included, just before it flows into Rhine. The Rheingau spans about 50 km from end to end. North of the Rheingau rises the Taunus mountain range, so most of the Rheingau's vineyards are on south-facing slope between hills and streams, which provides excellent wine-growing conditions in these northerly latitudes.

== History ==
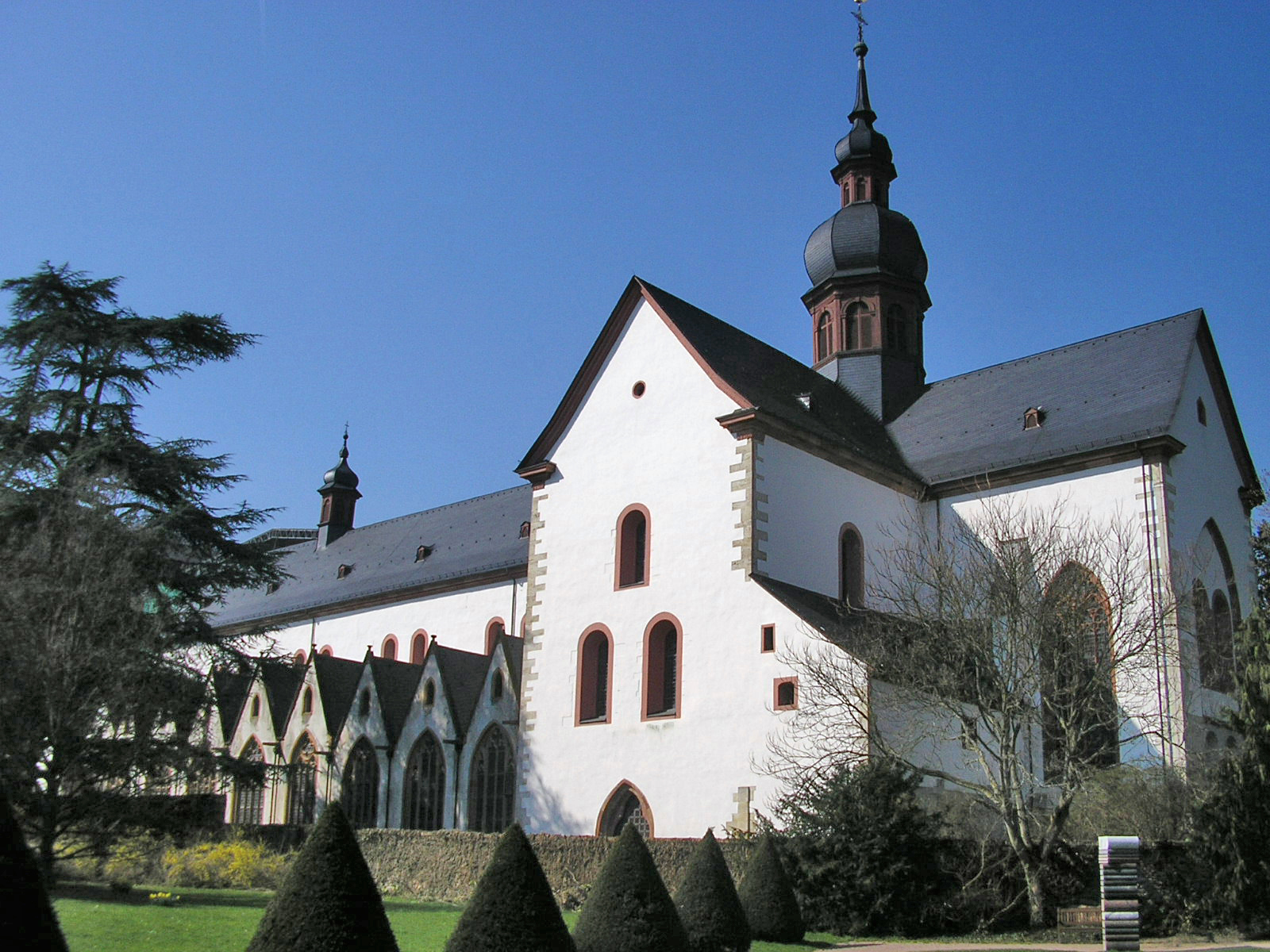
The Eberbach Abbey was built by the Cistercian monks who founded much of the Rheingau wine industry, and the buildings still house a wine cellar of the Hessian state winery and are used for wine auctions.

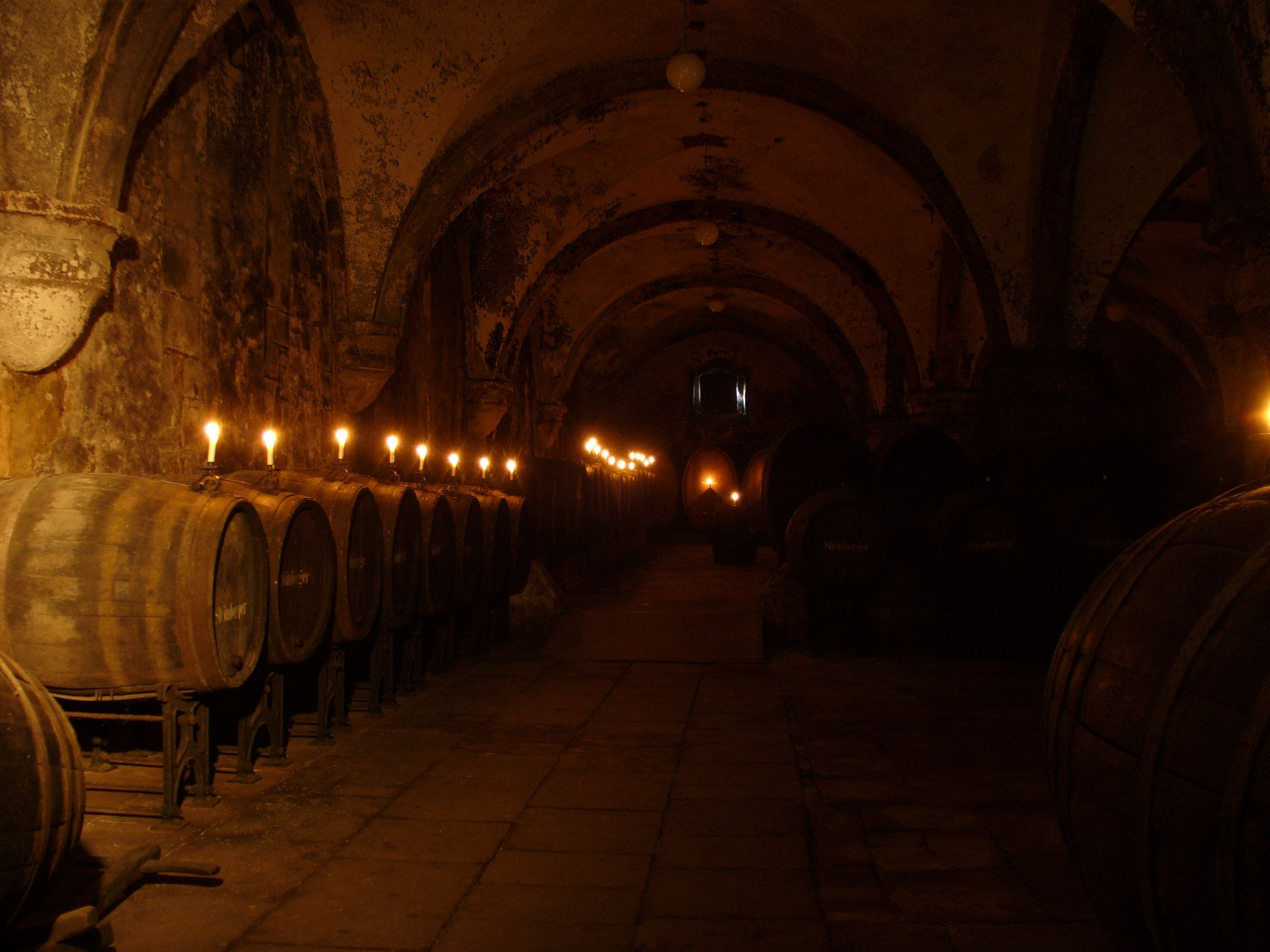
Old wine cellar at Eberbach Abbey

Since the Verona donation in 983, the Rheingau belonged to the archbishopric of Mainz. Legend has it that Charlemagne let the first vineyards be planted in the region, close to present-day Schloss Johannisberg. However finds like a Roman origin grapevine cutting knife point to even earlier cultivation. Better documented is the early influence of the church on Rheingau winemaking, which was controlled from Eberbach Abbey. Augustinians and Benedictines are known to have inhabited the area of the later abbey from 1116, and in 1135 the Cistercians arrived, sent out from Clairvaux. Legend has it that the Cistercians, which are also credited with having founded the wine industry in Burgundy, brought Pinot noir with them to Rheingau, although the earliest record of the grape variety in Rheingau is from 1470. The slopes down from the Taunus mountains belonging to Eberbach Abbey were planted as vineyards in the 12th century, and early in the 13th century the vineyards had reached their present area. In medieval times, more red than white wine was produced, usually as Gemischter Satz, i.e. the vineyards were planted with mixed varieties which were vinified together.

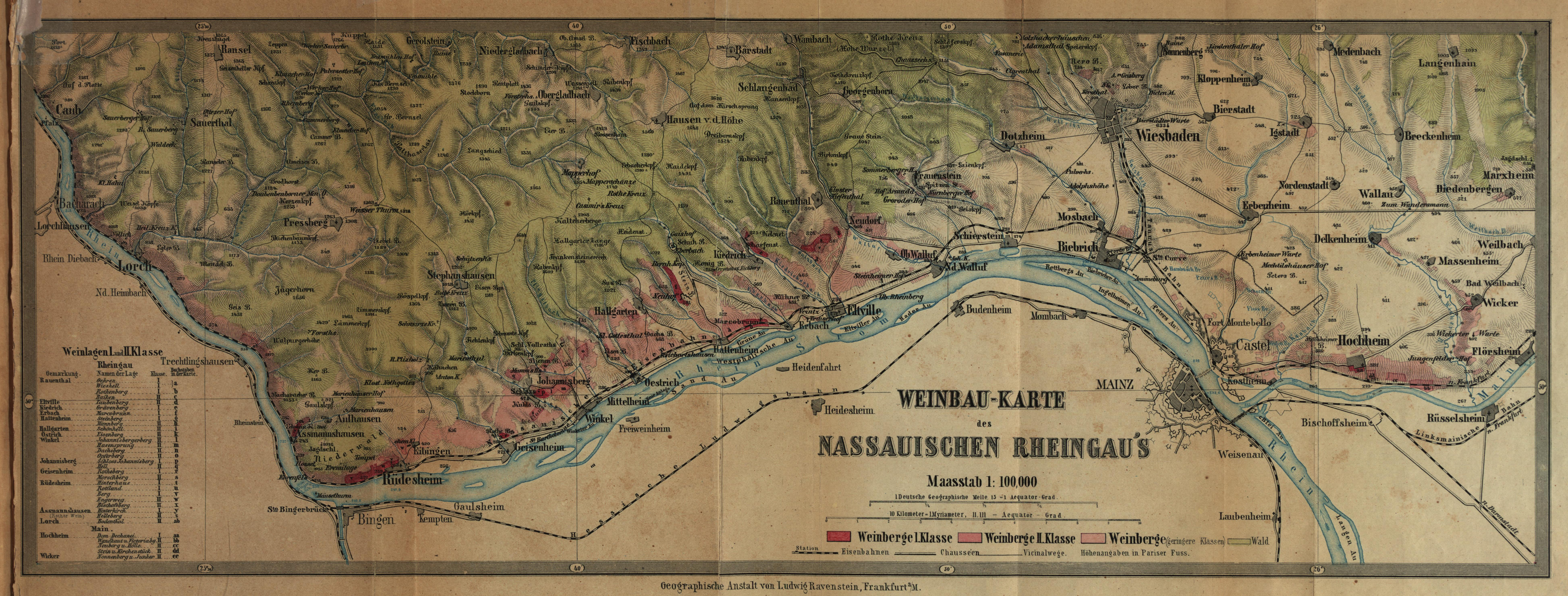
Rheingau Wine Official Classification of 1867

In 2011 it was unveiled, that the Official Wine Classification in the Rheingau has a 150 years history. The classification was the basis for taxation of wineries after the annexation of the Duchy of Nassau by the Kingdom of Prussia in 1866. In the book Der nassauische Weinbau published in 1867 by Friedrich Wilhelm Dünkelberg a historical map Weinbau-Karte des nassauischen Rheingaus (Viticultural map of the Rheingau in the Duchy of Nassau), all known vineyards at that time had been marked up by colour, evaluated and classified in first class vineyards (I. Klasse), second class vineyards (II. Klasse) and the remaining vineyards .

As first class vineyards (I. Klasse) only 13 Lagen in 9 boundaries had been classified:

Boundary	Name of the Lage
Rauenthal	Gehren, Wieshell, Rothenberg
Kiedrich	Grävenberg
Erbach	Marcobrunn
Hattenheim	Steinberg
Johannisberg	Schloss Johannisberg
Geisenheim	Rotheberg
Rüdesheim	Hinterhaus, Rottland, Berg
Assmannshausen	Hinterkirch (Rother Wein)
Hochheim	Dom-Dechanei

== Villages and producers ==
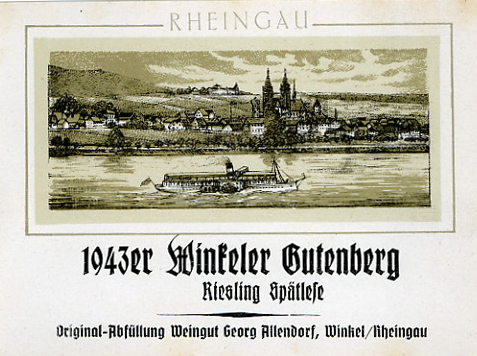
A Riesling 1943 wine label from Winkel. A steam boat on the Rhine.

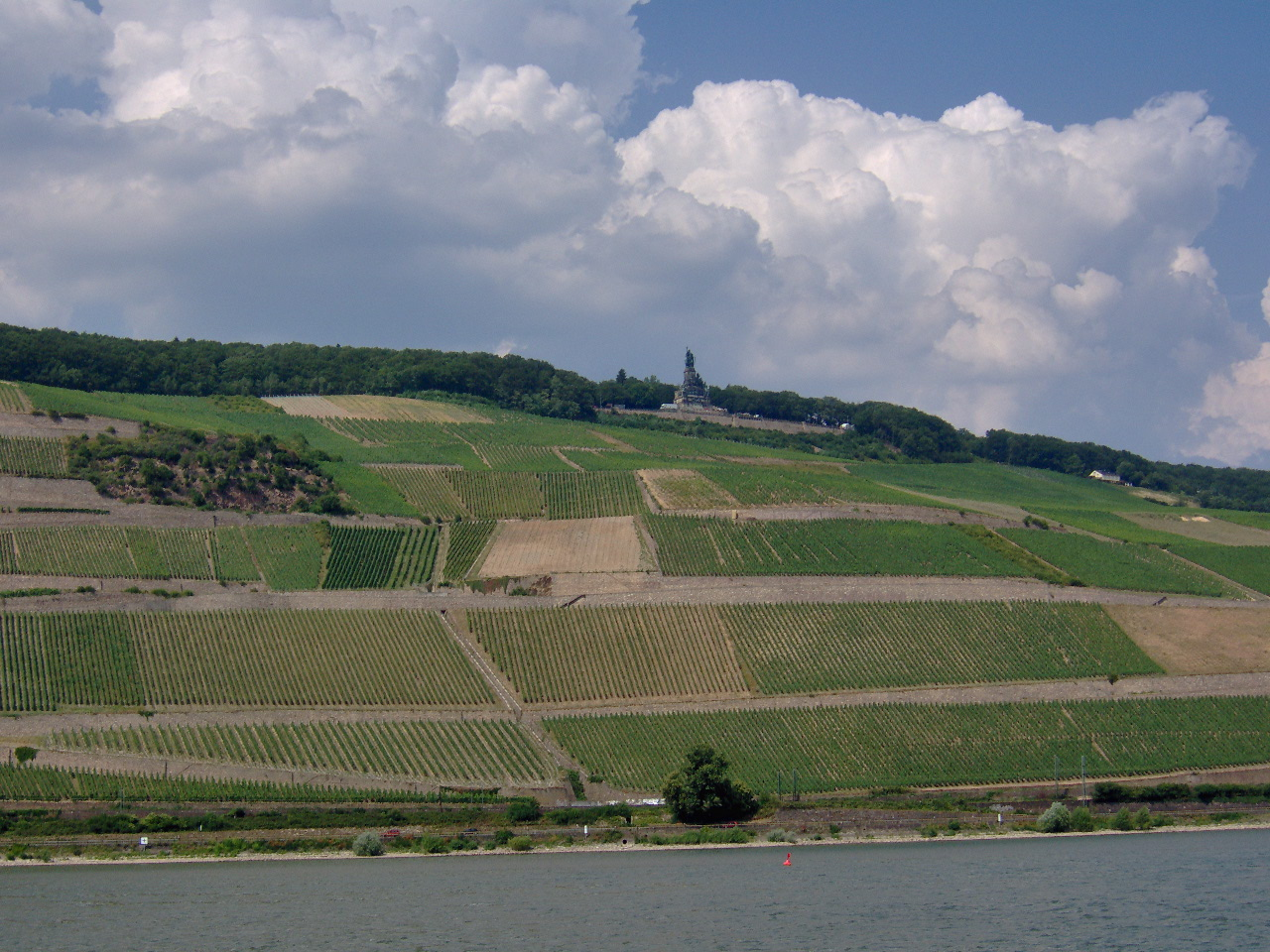
Vineyards close to Rüdesheim, collectively known as Rüdesheimer Berg, as seen from the opposite side of the Rhine

Some villages of Rheingau, listed in the downstream direction of Rhine, with some notable vineyards and producers.

- Hochheim am Main
  - vineyards Domdechaney, Kirchenstück and Hochheimer Hölle
  - Weingut Künstler
  - Weingut W. J. Schäfer
- Walluf
  - J.B. Becker, a family owned wine-producer since 1893
- Eltville
  - Hessische Staatsweingüter Kloster Eberbach ("Hessian State Wineries Eberbach Abbey"), moved 2008 to a new cellar next to the vineyard Steinberg, Kloster Eberbach
- Rauenthal
  - vineyards Baiken and Nonnenberg
- Kiedrich
  - vineyard Gräfenberg
  - Weingut Robert Weil
- Hattenheim
  - vineyards Mannberg and Wisselbrunnen
  - vineyard Steinberg, next to Eberbach Abbey, does not use a village name in its vineyard designation
  - Hessische Staatsweingüter Kloster Eberbach has its main cellars in a newly constructed facility close to the Steinberg vineyard, after having previously been located in Eltville
  - vineyard Marcobrunn, is shared with the neighbouring village of Erbach
- Oestrich
  - vineyards Doosberg and Lenchen
  - Weingut Josef Spreitzer
  - Weingut Peter Jakob Kühn
- Winkel
  - vineyards Hasensprung and Jesuitengarten
  - Schloss Vollrads, both a producer and a vineyard name, does not use a village name in its vineyard designation
- Johannisberg
  - Schloss Johannisberg, both a producer and a vineyard name, does not use a village name in its vineyard designation
- Rüdesheim
  - vineyards Rüdesheimer Berg, primarily Berg Roseneck, Berg Rottland and Berg Schlossberg
  - Weingut Georg Breuer
  - Weingut Carl Jung
  - Weingut Josef Leitz
  - Weingut Dr. Heinrich Nägler
- Assmannshausen
  - vineyard Höllenberg, famous for its red wines
  - Weingut August Kesseler

== Maps ==
Rheingau Members Verband Deutscher Prädikatsweingüter
1 Allendorf
2 Barth
3 Belz
4 Jung
5 Diefenhardt
6 Eberbach
7 Erbslöh
8 Eser
9 Fendel
10 Straßenmühle
11 Hochschule Geisenheim
12 Freimuth
13 Müller
14 Hessen
15 Hupfeld
16 Johannisberg
17 Kaufmann
18 Kessler
19 Knyphausen
20 König
21 Krone
22 Kühn
23 Künstler
24 Kunz
25 Leitz
26 Löwenstein
27 Oettinger
28 Prinz
29 Querbach
30 Ress
31 Schönleber
32 Spreitzer
33 Vollrads
34 Weil
35 Werner

== Grape varieties ==
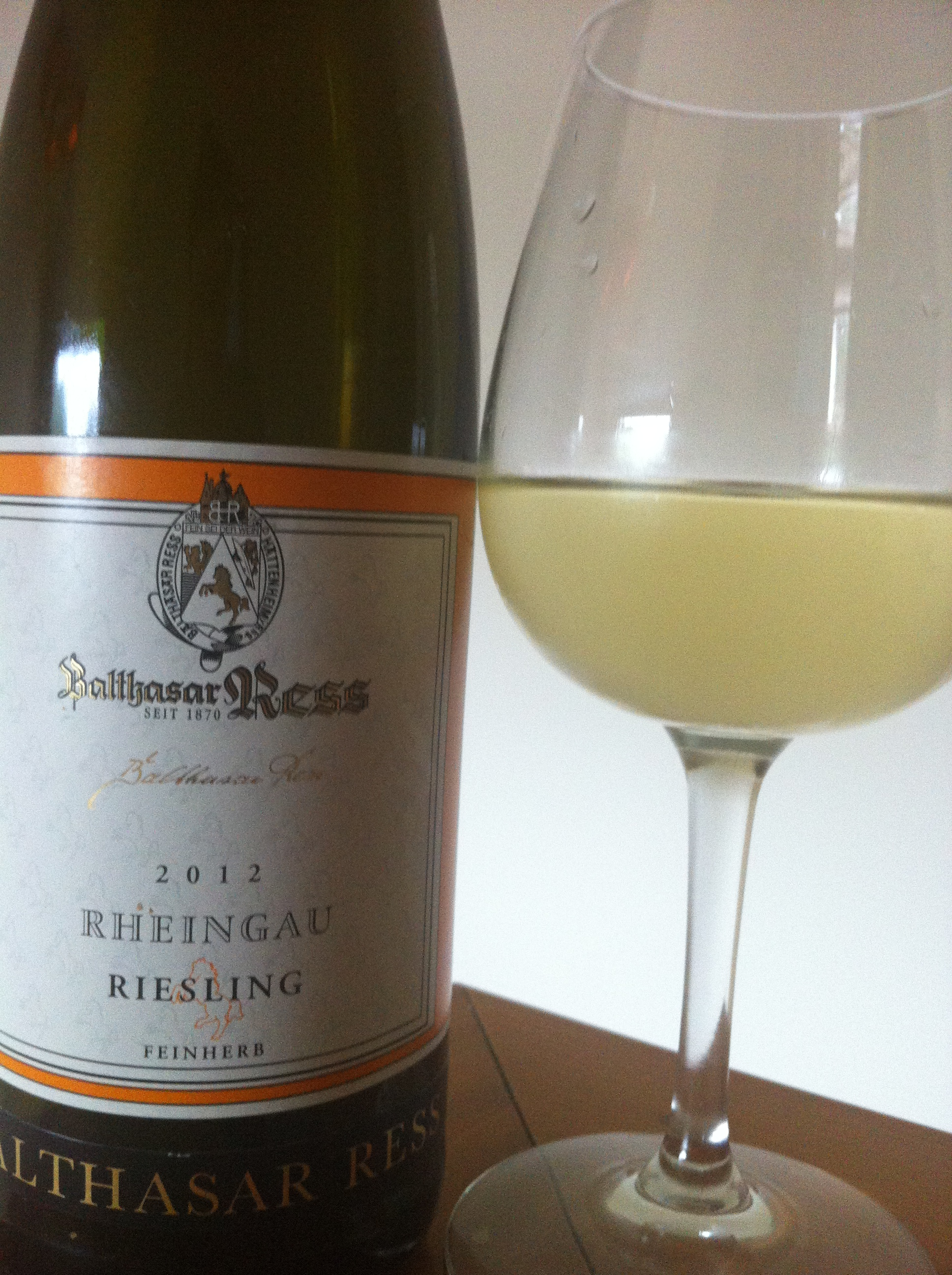
A Riesling from the Rheingau using the "Feinherb" (off dry) designation

The most cultivated grape varieties, by area in 2019, were:

- Riesling, 2475 ha (77.7%)
- Spätburgunder, 388 ha (12.3%)
- Weißer Burgunder, 56 ha
- Grauer Burgunder, 31 ha
- Müller-Thurgau, 29 ha
- Chardonnay, 27 ha
- Sauvignon blanc, 17 ha
- Dornfelder, 12 ha
- Kerner, 9 ha
- Dunkelfelder, 7 ha
