= St. Martinus, Hattersheim =

Catholic church in Hesse, Germany

St. Martinus
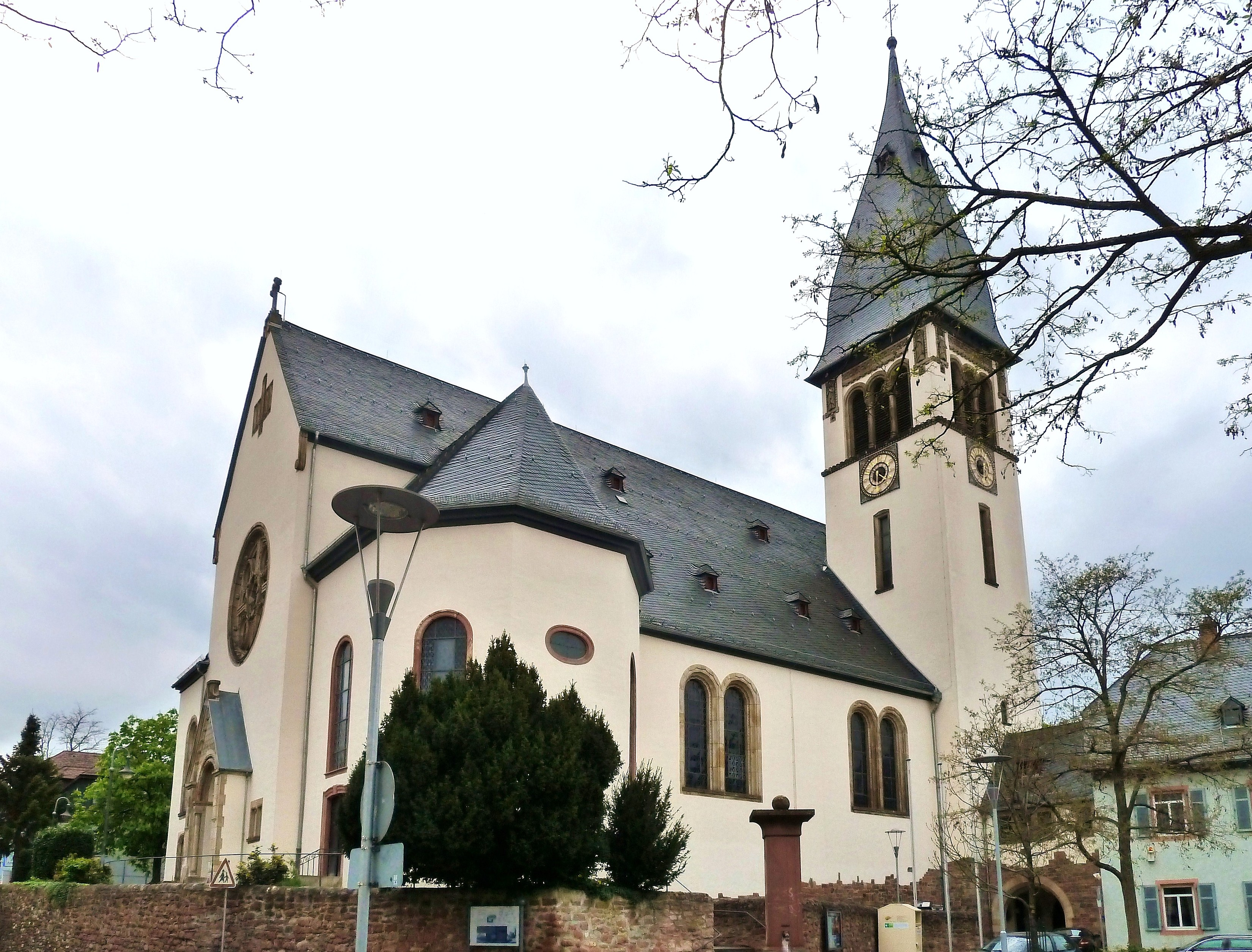
- St. Martinus
- 50°04′11″N 08°29′11″E
- Location: Hattersheim am Main, Main-Taunus-Kreis, Hesse, Germany
- Denomination: Catholic
- Website: Official website

History
- Dedication: St. Martin

Architecture
- Functional status: Active
- Architect: Ludwig Becker
- Years built: 1747— 1915 (larger church)

Administration
- Diocese: Limburg

St. Martinus is a Catholic church and parish in Hattersheim am Main, Main-Taunus-Kreis, Hesse, Germany. It belongs to the Diocese of Limburg. The present church was built by Ludwig Becker in Romanesque revival style with allusions to Jugendstil, completed in 1915. He incorporated features from the earlier Baroque building.

== History ==
The present church is in the centre of Hattersheim, prominently at its highest point at 100 metres (330 ft). A medieval chapel was the first house of worship at the location in the former village, documented in 1313 when Hattersheim became an independent parish. In 1747, a Baroque church was built, with a ridge turret. It was dedicated to Martin of Tours. A statue of Mary from the 15th century and a pulpit from around 1800 were kept, when the church was mostly demolished to make room for a larger building.

The present building in Romanesque revival style with elements of Jugendstil was designed by Ludwig Becker. He used part of the previous church as a transept in the back of the new building, now serving as a chapel for baptisms. He also retained the windows and the entrance in the west, and the turret. Building was completed in 1915.

The choir of the new church faces west, with a high tower on the side, covered with a double-arched elongated cupola. The interior is covered with coffered barrel vaults. All vaults are decorated with painting. The glass windows are by August Martin from Wiesbaden, notably of the chancel windows with the Seven Sacraments behind the pulpit. The church contains three altars: the Virgin Mary Altar from 1915, and the High Altar and the Sacred Heart Altar, added in 1930, all created in Hans Steinlein's Eltville workshop.

The pipe organ, with 36 stops, three manuals and pedal, was built in 1936 by Eduard Wagenbach. It is suitable for music of the Romantic era. The church is a venue of the Rheingau Musik Festival; the vocal ensemble Voces8 appeared on 14 July 2022 with a program named Stardust, of music from William Byrd to Nat King Cole. It was recorded to be aired in the ARD Radio Festival of the German public broadcasters.

The parish is part of the Diocese of Limburg. Other churches within the parish St. Martinus are Christ König in Okriftel and St. Martin in Eddersheim.
