= St. Martin, Oestrich =

St. Martin
- Kath. Pfarrkirche St. Martin
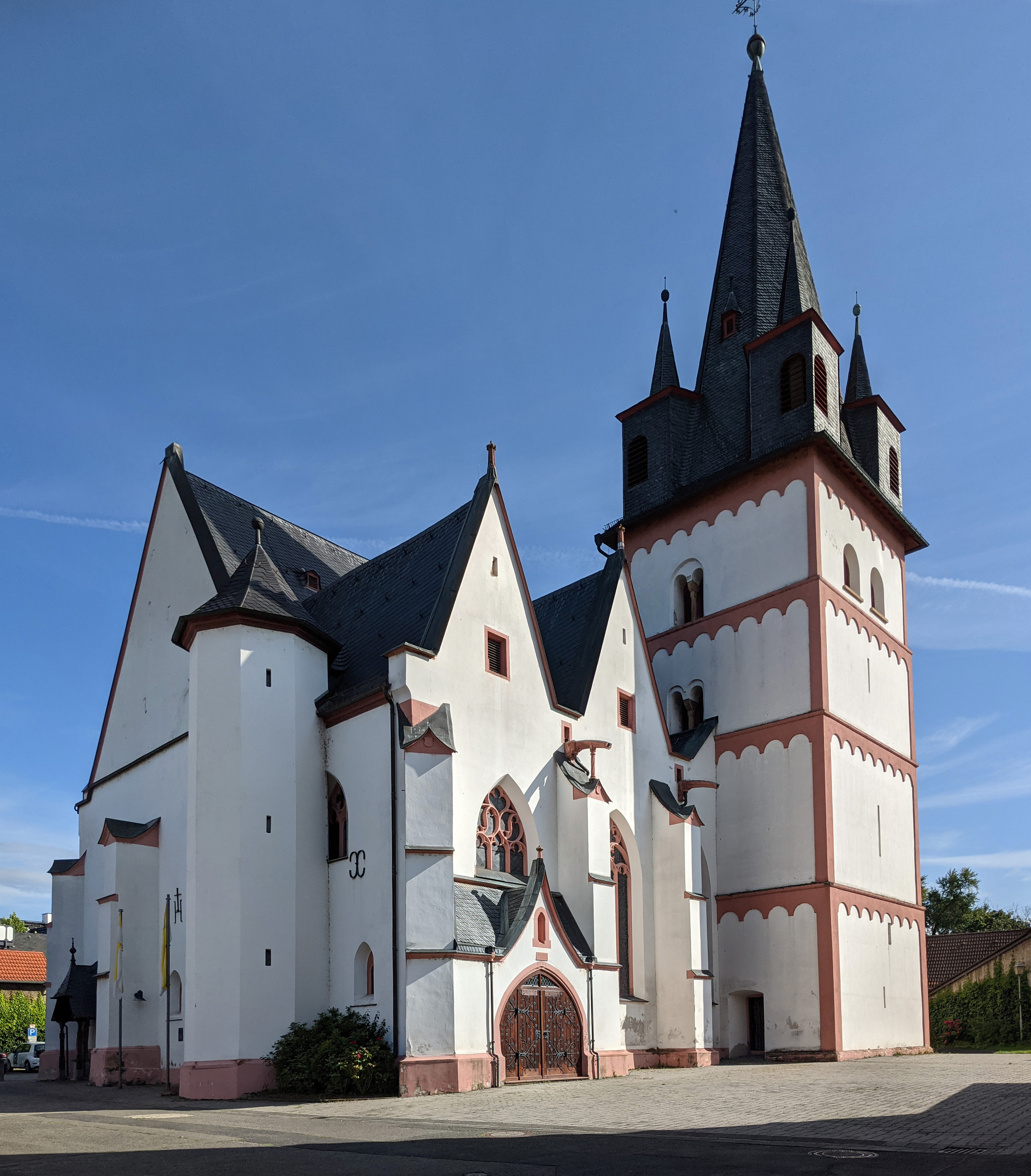
- St. Martin
- 50°0′18″N 8°1′52.32″E
- Location: Oestrich, Hesse
- Country: Germany
- Denomination: Catholic
- Website: oestrich.bistumlimburg.de

History
- Status: Parish church
- Dedication: Martin of Tours

Architecture
- Functional status: Active
- Heritage designation: Kulturdenkmal Hessen
- Architectural type: Hall church
- Style: Late Gothic
- Years built: 1st half of the 12th century (tower); 1508 (church) c. 1648 (simple repairs); 1893–1894 (repairs and restoration)

Administration
- Diocese: Limburg

St. Martin is the name of a Catholic church and former parish in Oestrich, Rheingau-Taunus-Kreis, Germany. It was built as a hall church from 1508 in late-Gothic style. It was destroyed in the Thirty Years' War and rebuilt in simpler style, but restored to its Gothic appearance in 1894.

The parish was merged in 2015 to St. Peter und Paul in Eltville. It is part of the Diocese of Limburg.

== Building ==
=== History ===
Oestrich was the seat of the dean of the Rheingau region, therefore its church was probably the oldest one there. It is located in the east of the old village and was surrounded by a protected graveyard. A source from 1493 reports that it belonged to the Stift St. Victor in Mainz from between 975 and 1011. The present building was preceded by a church in Romanesque style from the first half of the 12th century, dedicated to Martin of Tours. Foundations of a Romanesque Langhaus within the present church were discovered during restorations in 1964 and 1994/95. The Romanesque tower, dating back to the first half of the 12th century, was preserved.

The present church in late-Gothic style was completed around 1508. The church burned down during the Thirty Years' War in 1635. After the Peace of Westphalia in 1648, it was rebuilt in simpler form with a flat ceiling instead of the vaults.

In 1893/94 the previous Gothic hall with star vaults was restored, supervised by Ludwig Becker from Mainz. A Gothic Revival organ balcony replaced the Baroque one; the sacristy was enlarged, and two chapels were added. After a fire in 1963, the roof of the tower was restored to its original form.

=== Modern history ===
In 2015 the parish was merged, along with other parishes, to St. Peter und Paul in Eltville. It is part of the Diocese of Limburg.

== Description ==
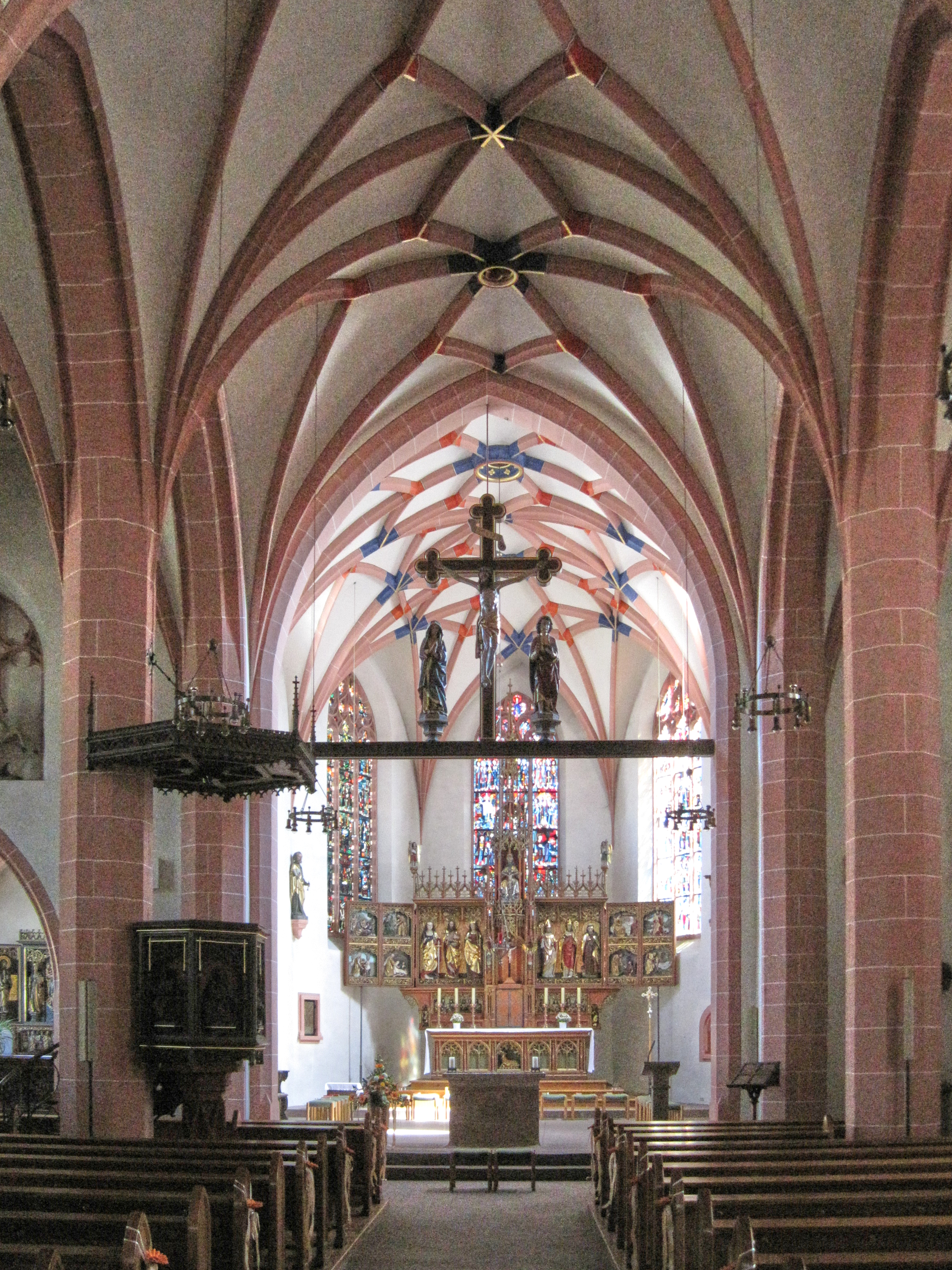
Interior, facing east, showing the restored vaulting

The church is a three-aisled hall church; the nave ends with a slightly recessed apse in the east. The tower cuts into the southern aisle halfway. The eight-sided tower spire has four corners in late-Gothic form. The choir is higher than the nave. The south porch dates to 1508, the north porch to 1893/94.

=== Furnishings ===
The high altar houses in a Gothic Revival shrine six statues, four or them dating to 1500 (Saint Barbara, John the Baptist, Saint Gregory and Saint Boniface). Saint Catherine is from around 1520, and a Gothic Revival Saint Benedict was added. The Marian altar in the northern side chapel was created around 1500 for the village church of Gernewitz, Thuringia (nowadays a district of Stadtroda). A Saint Anna altar from around 1720 with a marble top shows a sculpture depiction of her teaching Mary to read. A large crucifixion in the triumphal arch features statues of Jesus and Mary from the 19th century combined with John the Evangelist from c. 1500. A baptismal font of black marble is from the mid-18th century. A Gothic Revival pulpit features the four Evangelists.

=== Organ ===
The organ was built by the organ builder Förster & Nicolaus from Lich in 1981. The instrument has 26 stops on two manuals and a pedalboard.

== Events ==
Services from St. Martin were broadcast live by ZDF on 4 July 2021 and on 11 June 2023.
