= Weingut Dr. Heinrich Nägler =

German wine grower and producer

Coordinates: 49°58′51″N 7°55′50″E

- Location: Rüdesheim, Germany
- Appellation: Rheingau
- Founded: 1826
- Key people: Tilbert Nägler
- Cases/yr: 4,200
- Varietal: Riesling
- Website: www.weingut-dr-naegler.de/startsei.htm

Weingut Dr. Heinrich Nägler

Weingut Dr. Heinrich Nägler is a German wine grower and producer based in Rüdesheim am Rhein, in the wine-growing region of Rheingau, Germany.

== History ==
The first record of the Nägler estate can be retrieved in the Rüdesheimer Stockbuch of 1826, with Friedrich Nägler having continuous ownership since that point.

Today's tenant the Geisenheimer Tilbert Nägler had undertaken apprenticeship in “Weingut Prinz von Preußen” Schloß Reinhartshausen followed by studying viticulture and oenology in Geisenheim. Before he started to work at his home estate on a full-time basis Tilbert was for six years accountable for the 90 ha vineyards at “Schloß Reinhartshausen” and four years working as CEO and master winemaker in the winery of the von Opel family, “Schloß Westerhaus” in Ingelheim am Rhein.

With this practical experience and his degree in oenology by the Geisenheim College, Tilbert runs the winery since his mother Wiltrud consigned him with the estate.

Weingut Dr. Heinrich Nägler was a member of the Verband Deutscher Prädikatsweingüter (VDP).

== Vineyards and wine ==
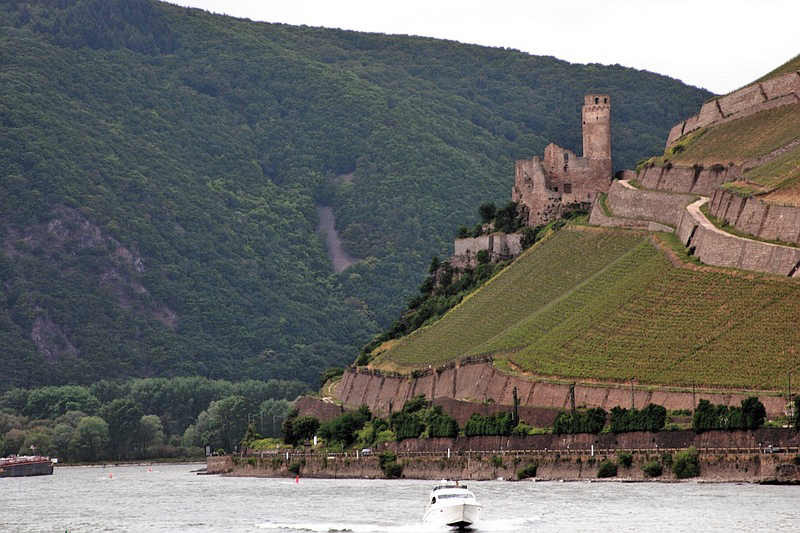
Rüdesheimer Berg with Ehrenfels Castle (Hesse), surrounded by important vineyards for Dr. Heinrich Nägler

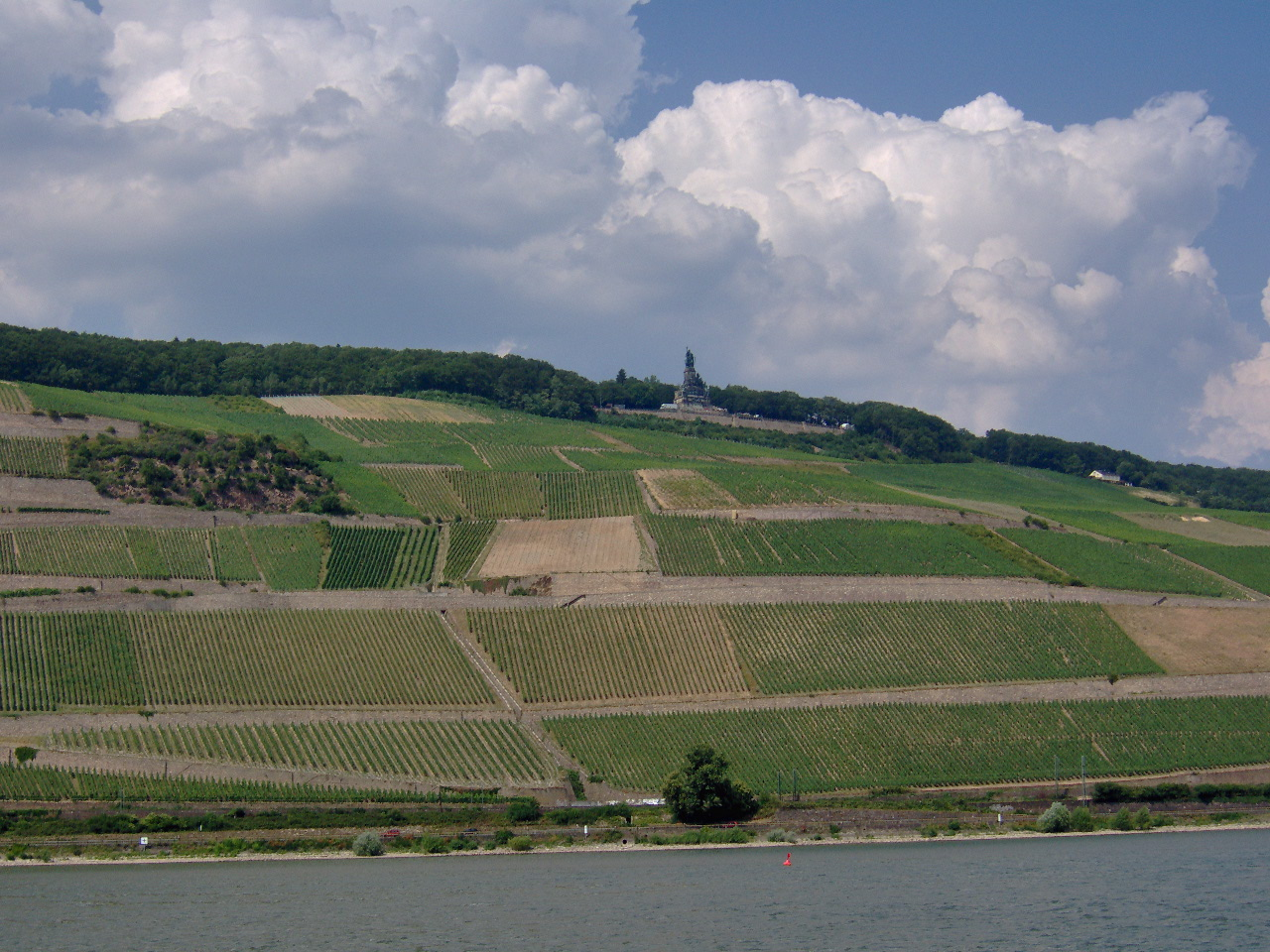
Rüdesheimer Berg Roseneck; above the Niederwalddenkmal

Weingut Dr. Heinrich Nägler owns a total of 8.5 hectares (21 acres), 90% of them planted with Riesling vines around Rüdesheim. The estate stretches across the „Rüdesheimer Berg“ with steep slope viticulture and presence of quartzite and slate in changing shares and comprises part of the top vineyard sites “Rüdesheimer Berg Schloßberg”, “Rüdesheimer Berg Roseneck”, “Rüdesheimer Berg Rottland”, “Rüdesheimer Bischofsberg” and “Rüdesheimer Drachenstein” vineyards. Wine writer Stephen Brook appreciated some of the ice wine of the Rüdesheimer Berg Rottland in his book Liquid Gold.

The average annual production is around 4,200 cases of wine, dependent upon the conditions of each vintage. Wines are produced at all Prädikat levels, as well as top level dry wines designated as Erste Lage. In order to achieve this result the pruning reduces the crop to a maximum of 55 hl/ha.

== Assessment ==
- André Dominé ranks the winery with four stars among his selected Rheingau wineries in Germany.
- Weingut Dr. Heinrich Nägler was recommended in the Gault Millau Weinguide 2010.
