= Schloss Vollrads =

German castle and wine estate

- Location: Oestrich-Winkel, Germany
- Coordinates: 50°0′46″N 7°59′46″E
- Founded: 1330
- Key people: Rowald Hepp
- Parent company: Nassauische Sparkasse
- Known for: Schloss Vollrads Riesling
- Varietal: Riesling
- Distribution: International
- Tasting: Open to the public
- Website: www.schlossvollrads.com/en

Schloss Vollrads

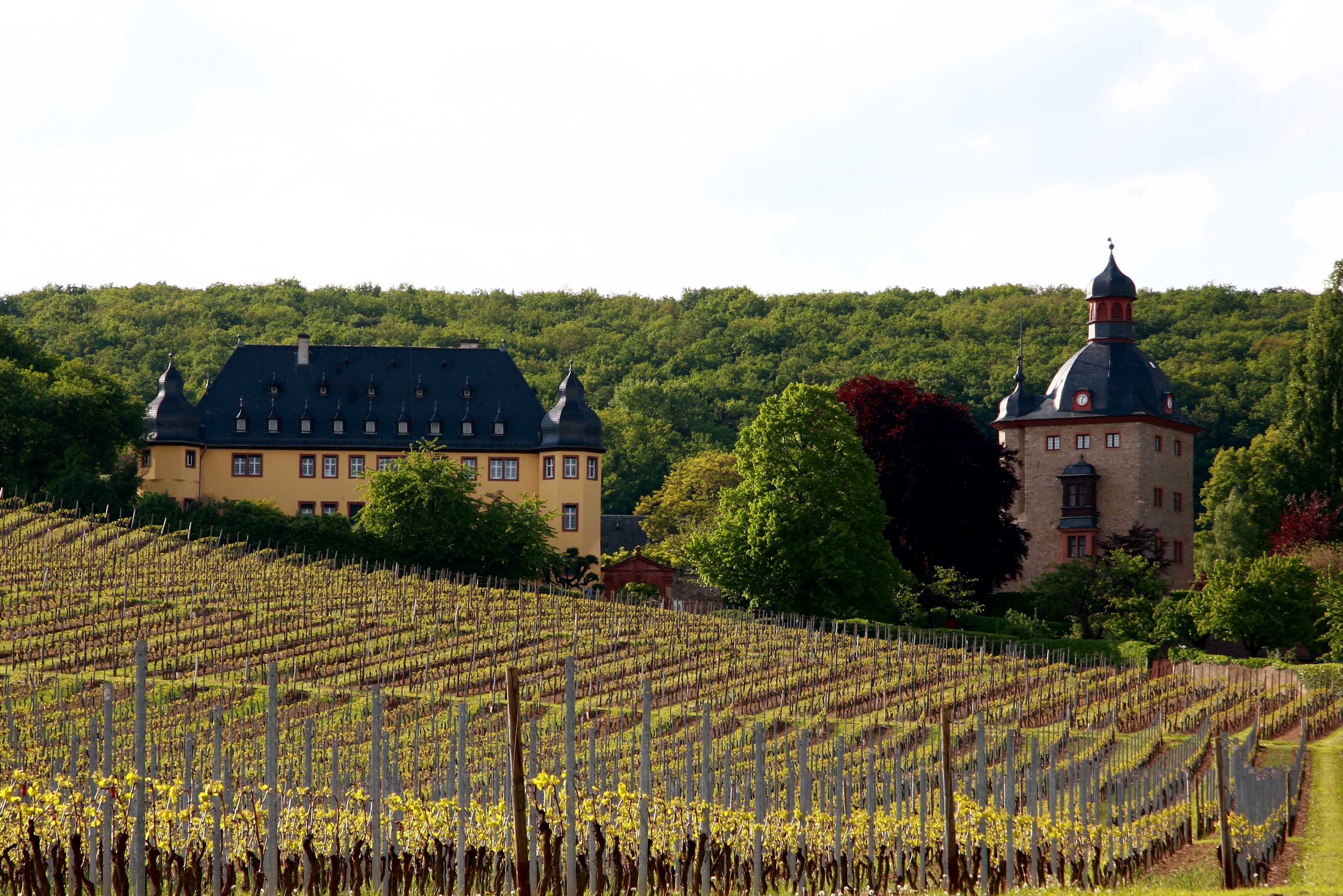
Schloss Vollrads in Rheingau

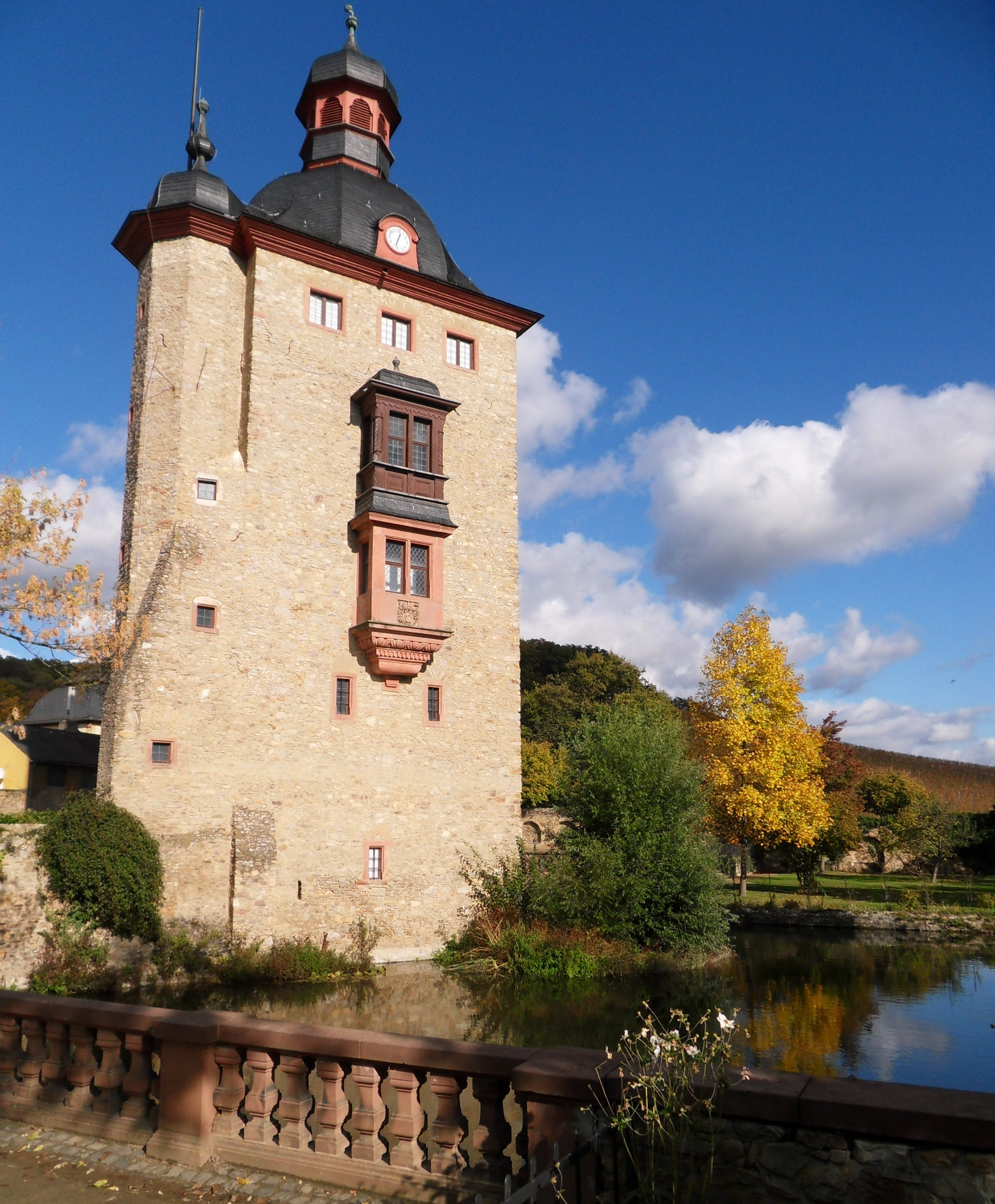
Keep or Tower house, early 14th century, bay window of 1620

Schloss Vollrads is a castle and a wine estate in the Rheingau wine-growing region in Germany. It has been making wine for over 800 years.

== History ==
After the donation of Verona in 983 the archbishopric of Mainz, the new owner, invested in vine growing. However, vines had been cultivated there since Roman times. The manor house was named after the Lords of Winkel; Vollradus is a given name. In 1218 a "Vollradus in Winkela" (so-called knight Vollradus), in 1268 a "Conradus dictus Vollradus armiger" is documented. No building originating from this time is traceable.

Today the core building of the estate is a substantial tower house, as a water castle surrounded by a square pond. Therefore, the house is only reachable by bridge. This keep can be traced to the first third of the 14th century and the family of Greiffenclau, the heirs of the Lords of Winkel. The octagon stage tower, flanking the donjon, was erected in 1471; the bay window was added in 1620. Above the doorway the coat of arms of the Greiffenclau family is to be seen.

In 1684 the present two-winged manor house was built by Georg Phillip Greiffenclau von Vollrads near the tower. His son Johann Erwein erected the estate buildings around 1700, as well as boundary walls around the manor garden, and finally equipped the tower with a typical baroque roof.

In 1907/1908 Countess Clara Matuschka-Greiffenclau had the buildings remodelled. She increased the height of the southern wing of the mansion by a third floor, added two towers with an onion dome, and enlarged the terraces and the bay windows at the Donjon.

In 1975 Erwein Graf Matuschka-Greiffenclau took charge of the property, which was heavily in debt. Although an important figure in the emergence of a new or rediscovered style of high quality dry Rheingau wine in the 1980s and 1990s, he was not successful in reorganising his estate. When in 1997 the principal bank decided on the declaration of bankruptcy, Erwein, who was then also the chairman of the VDP-Rheingau, took his gun, went to his beloved vineyard, the neighbouring Greiffenberg, and committed suicide. Since then, the estate has belonged to the Nassauische Sparkasse bank, which runs the manor house as well as the vineyards and a restaurant.

The winery is a member of the Verband Deutscher Prädikatsweingüter (VDP).

Most of the time the manor house is not open to the public. Access is only allowed for special events. In the summer live music acts take place, especially as a venue of the Rheingau Musik Festival, and in the harvest season a public bar is opened in the center court.

== Geography ==
Schloss Vollrads is a vineyard site documented since the Middle Ages in the Rheingau within the boundaries of the collective site (Großlage) of Honigberg between Johannisberg, Winkel, Mittelheim and Erbach. The estate claims to be the oldest winery of Germany, which is not verifiable for the distinct single vineyard site (Einzellage) of 58 ha size.

Schloss Vollrads is in fact a vineyard designation (Einzellage) in its own right (as is Schloss Johannisberg), and one of a handful historic German vineyards which according to the wine law do not have to display a village name, which otherwise would be Winkel, on the label. Thus, the wines are simply labelled as "Schloss Vollrads Riesling", which signifies both the vineyard site, the producer and the grape variety.

The Riesling grape is the only grape variety used in the winery. Nevertheless, the whole range of Prädikat designations such as Kabinett, Spätlese, Auslese, Beerenauslese, Trockenbeerenauslese up to the Eiswein is vinified. Schloss Vollrads also produces dry wines under the Erstes Gewächs designation. The Vollrads Lage is highly "terroir-expressive", meaning that the character of Riesling wines is clearly influenced by the wine's place of origin. In order to avoid cork taint, the wine is sealed with Vino-Lok glass stoppers.

== Visitors ==
The estate offers guided tours with tastings, a wine bar, shop, and various special events. It is a regular concert stage for the Rheingau Musik Festival.

== See also ==
- List of oldest companies
