= Hetman (disambiguation) =

Hetman is a historical military title in Poland, Lithuania, Ukraine.

Hetman may also refer to:

- Hetman Białystok, Polish football team
- Hetman Zamość, Polish football team
- Hetman (train), Polish fast train
- Hetman is the Polish name for the chess queen.

== People with the surname ==
- Vadym Hetman (1935–1998), Ukrainian politician

== See also ==
- Heitmann
