= Siege of Eltville =

The siege of Eltville (or battle of Eltville) in May 1349 was the military engagement by which Charles IV secured the throne of the Holy Roman Empire against his rival, Günther of Schwarzburg. It was the third time a disputed succession in the Empire had been decided by battle.

Charles IV had been elected king in 1346 in opposition to the Emperor Louis IV, who died the following year. On 30 January 1349, Charles's opponents elected Günther king. The latter moved on Frankfurt, where he was crowned on 6 February. Charles then led a large army to the Rhine and encamped at Mainz. The sources do not provide details of his operations. Günther apparently ensconced himself in Eltville, which, according to Matthias von Neuenburg, was a fortified town with a castle (oppidum cum castro). Charles induced Louis IV's son, Louis V of Bavaria, to abandon Günther.

Defeated, Günther agreed to a treaty with Charles on 26 May. On 29 May, he renounced his royal title. In return, his supporters received an amnesty and he received a payment of 20,000 marks raised by pawning imperial demesnes. The ill Günther died at Frankfurt on 19 June, possibly poisoned during the siege.

== Bibliography ==
- "Günther, King of Germany". Encyclopædia Britannica. 10 June 2020.
- Hlaváček, Ivan [in Czech] (2008). "The Luxemburgs and Rupert of the Palatinate, 1347–1410". In Michael Jones (ed.). The New Cambridge Medieval History: Volume VI, c. 1300–c. 1415. Cambridge University Press. pp. 551–569.
- Purton, Peter (2010). A History of the Late Medieval Siege, 1200–1500. The Boydell Press.
- Stubbs, William (1908). Germany in the Later Middle Ages, 1200–1500. Longmans.
- Waugh, W. T. (1932). "Germany: Charles IV". In J. R. Tanner; C. W. Previté-Orton; Z. N. Brooke (eds.). The Cambridge Medieval History, Volume VII: Decline of Empire and Papacy. Cambridge University Press. pp. 137–154.
- Wilson, Peter (2016). Heart of Europe: A History of the Holy Roman Empire. The Belknap Press.
