= Hock (wine) =

British term for German white wine

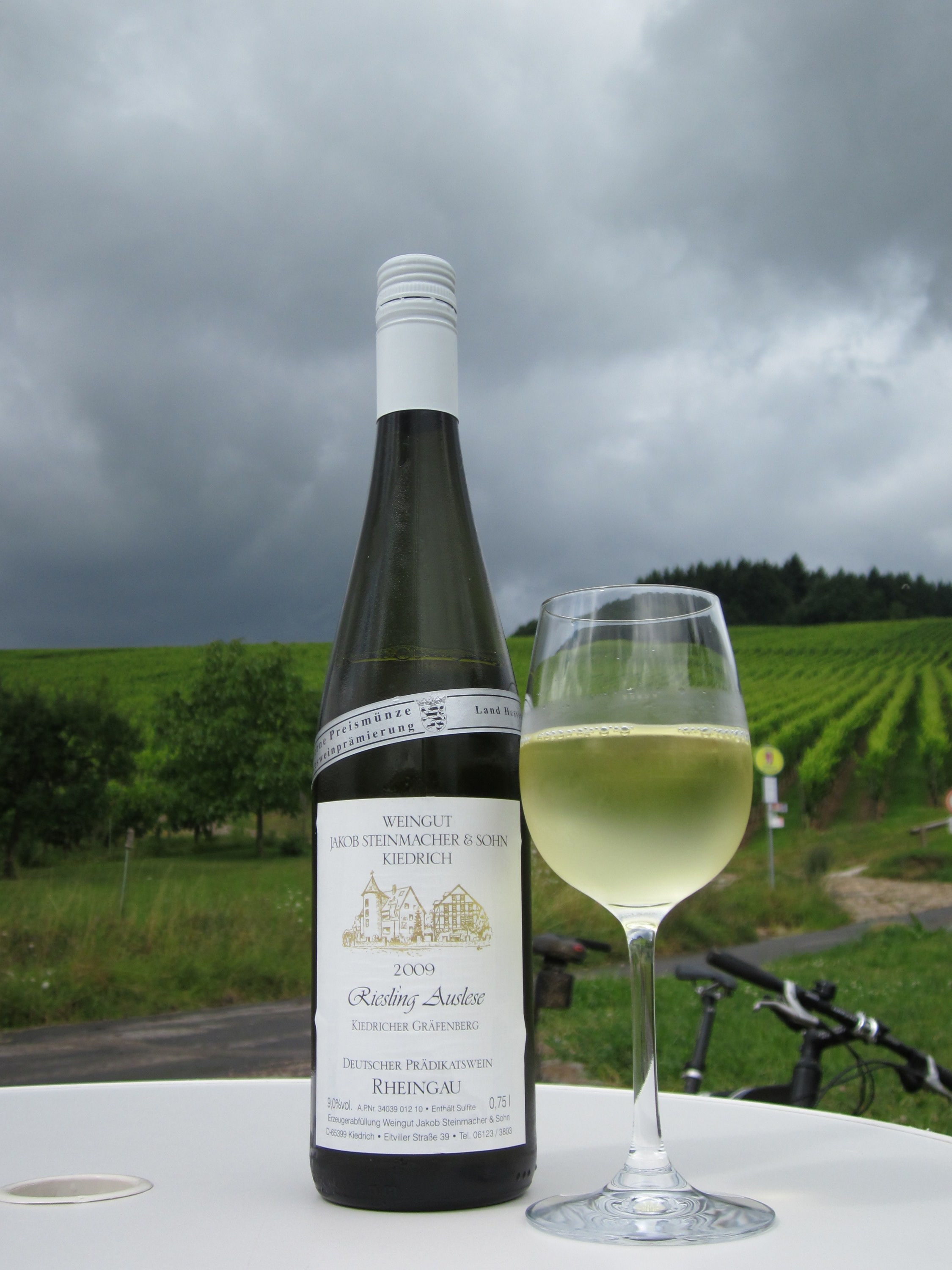
Riesling in its traditionally-shaped bottle

Hock is a British term for German white wine. It sometimes refers to white wine from the Rhine region (specifically Riesling) and sometimes to all German white wine. The word hock is short for the obsolete word hockamore, an alteration of "Hochheimer", derived from the name of the town of Hochheim am Main in Germany. Over the years, hock-shaped bottles have come to signify sweet, cheap wine in general.

The term seems to have been in use in the 17th century, initially for white wines (predominantly Riesling) from the Rheingau, but in the 18th century it came to be used for any German white wine sold in Britain, to convey some of the then very high prestige of Rheingau wine to (often much) lesser German wines.

It seems probable that Queen Victoria's visit in 1850 to Hochheim (in Rheingau) and its vineyards during harvest time contributed to the continued use of the term. Supposedly by HOCHheim becoming shortened to HOCH and the hard German CH becoming written as CK to aid English speakers in its pronunciation. By then, those Rheingau wines commanded high prices, on par with, and sometimes higher than, the best wines from Bordeaux and Burgundy, matching and sometimes exceeding them in prestige.

There are many vineyards associated with Hocks, such as Hochheimer, Rüdesheimer, Marcobrunner and Johannisberger.
