= Hochheim am Main =

- Town
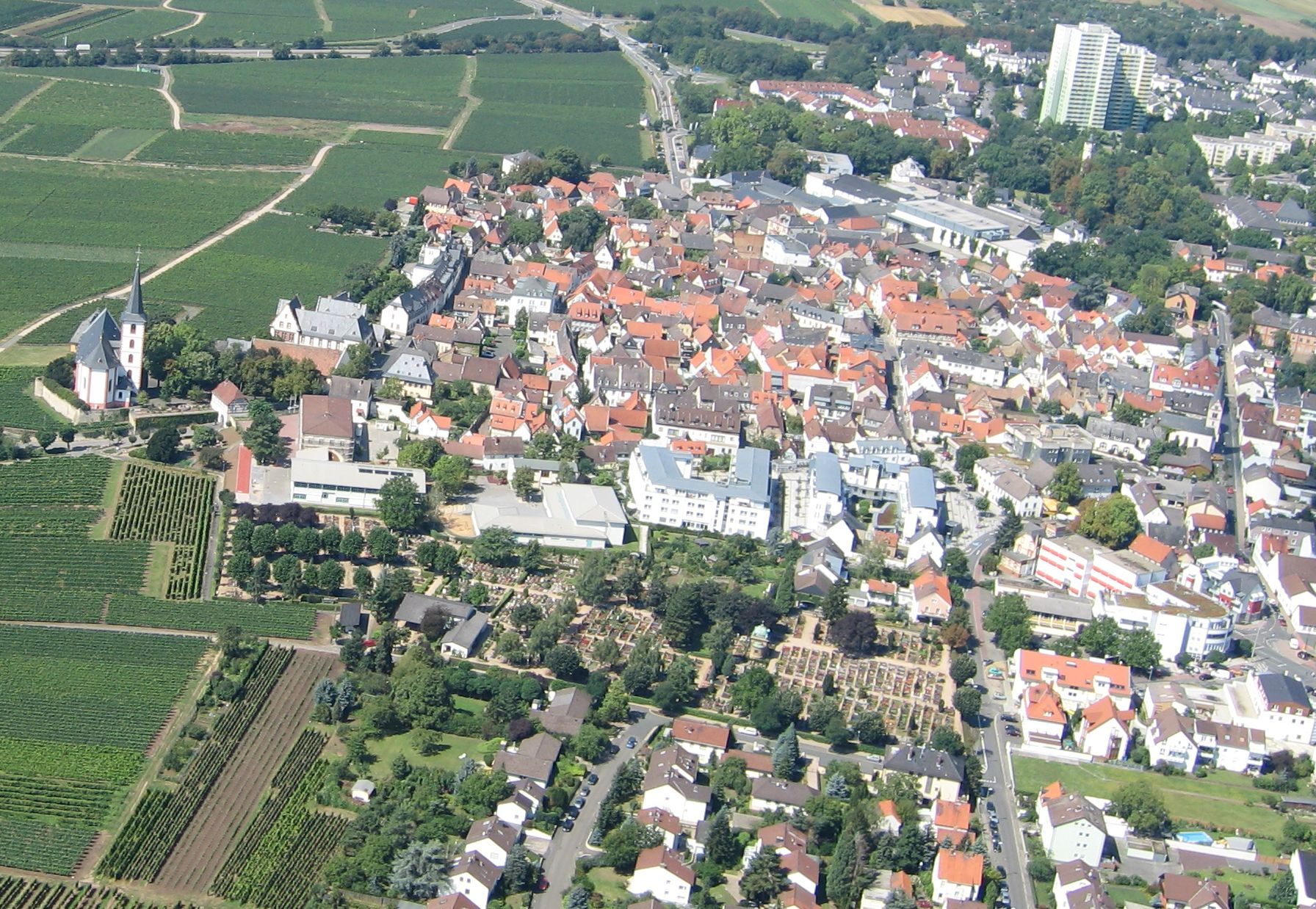
- Old Town of Hochheim am Main with the old cemetery

- Coat of arms

- Location of Hochheim am Main within Main-Taunus-Kreis district
- Interactive map of Hochheim am Main
- Location within Germany Location within Hesse
- Coordinates: 50°1′N 8°21′E
- Country: Germany
- State: Hesse
- Admin. region: Darmstadt
- District: Main-Taunus-Kreis

Government
  - Mayor (2021–27): Dirk Westedt

Area
  - Total: 19.47 km^{2} (7.52 sq mi)
- Elevation: 129 m (423 ft)

Population (2025-12-31)
  - Total: 18,425
  - Density: 946.3/km^{2} (2,451/sq mi)
- Time zone: UTC+01:00 (CET)
  - Summer (DST): UTC+02:00 (CEST)
- Postal codes: 65239
- Dialling codes: 06146
- Vehicle registration: MTK
- Website: www.hochheim.de

Hochheim am Main (German pronunciation: [ˈhoːxhaɪm ʔam ˈmaɪn], lit. 'Hochheim on the Main'; Old English: Hockamore) is a town in the Main-Taunus district of the German state of Hesse. It is located near the right bank of the river Main three miles above its confluence with the Rhine, as well as on the German Timber-Frame Road.

== Geography ==
=== Location ===
Located in the Rheingau, Hochheim has historically been a centre of the wine trade. The English word "hock", a generic term for Rhine wine, is derived from Hochheim.

== History ==
There is a historical reference to Hochheim in the chronicles as early as the 7th century. Hochheim is the site of an Austrian military victory over the French Empire on 7 November 1813.

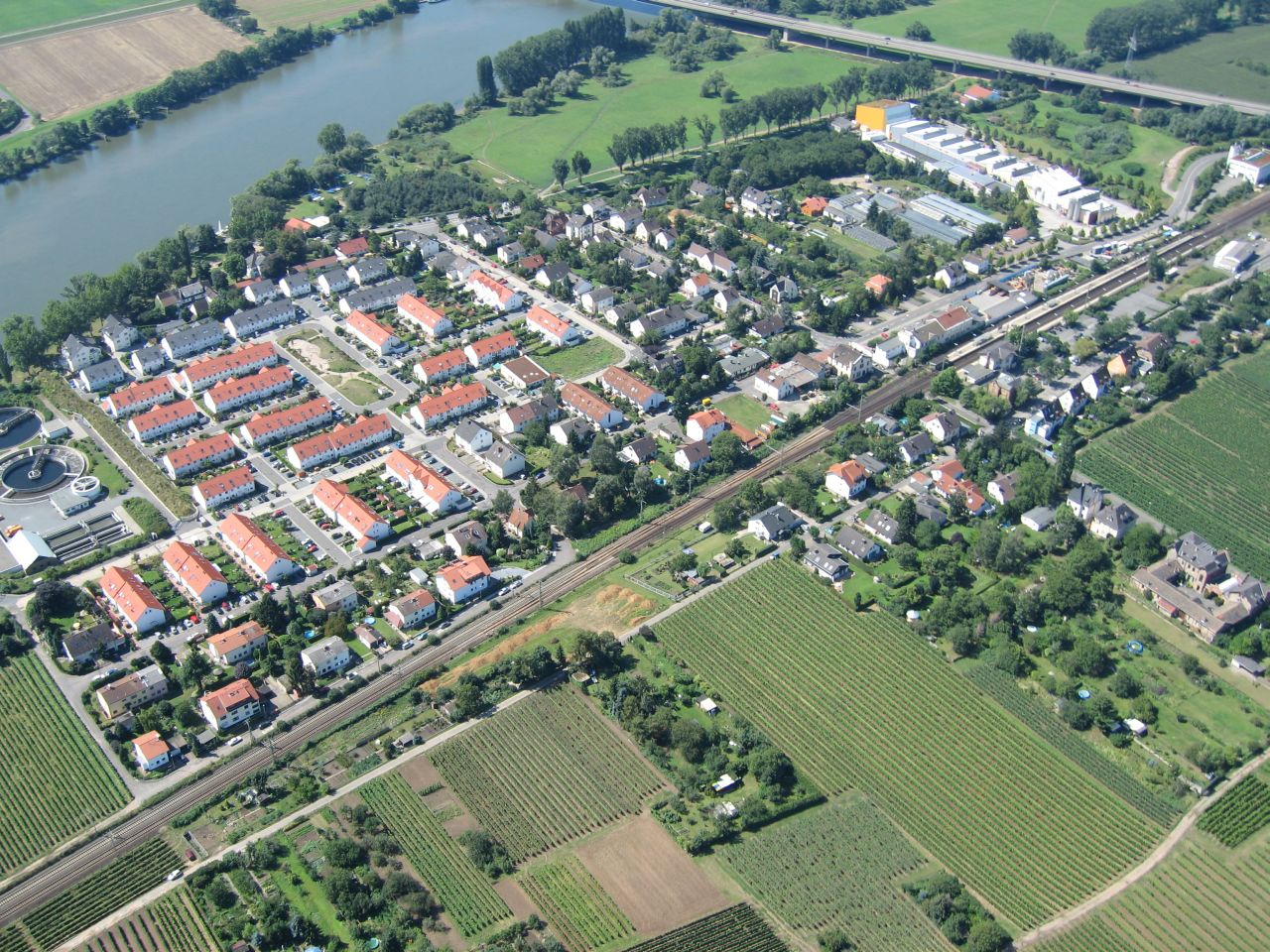
South of Hochheim am Main

== Town partnerships ==
Hochheim has the following twinned towns:

- Le Pontet, France since 1987
- Bonyhád, Hungary since 1997
- (Germany) Kölleda

== Education ==
Local children attend school in Hochheim until the Year 11 (UK) or 10th grade (US). After that, if they choose to continue with their education, they have to attend schools in Wiesbaden or Mainz.

== Notable residents ==
- Anne Heitmann, poet
- Valentin Petry, cyclist
- Carl Graeger (1849-1902), established Sekthaus Carl Graeger winery in 1877

== See also ==
- Schüler, Geschichte der Hochheim am Main (Hochheim, 1888)
