= Erbach, Rheingau =

Erbach (Rheingau)
- Stadtteil of Eltville
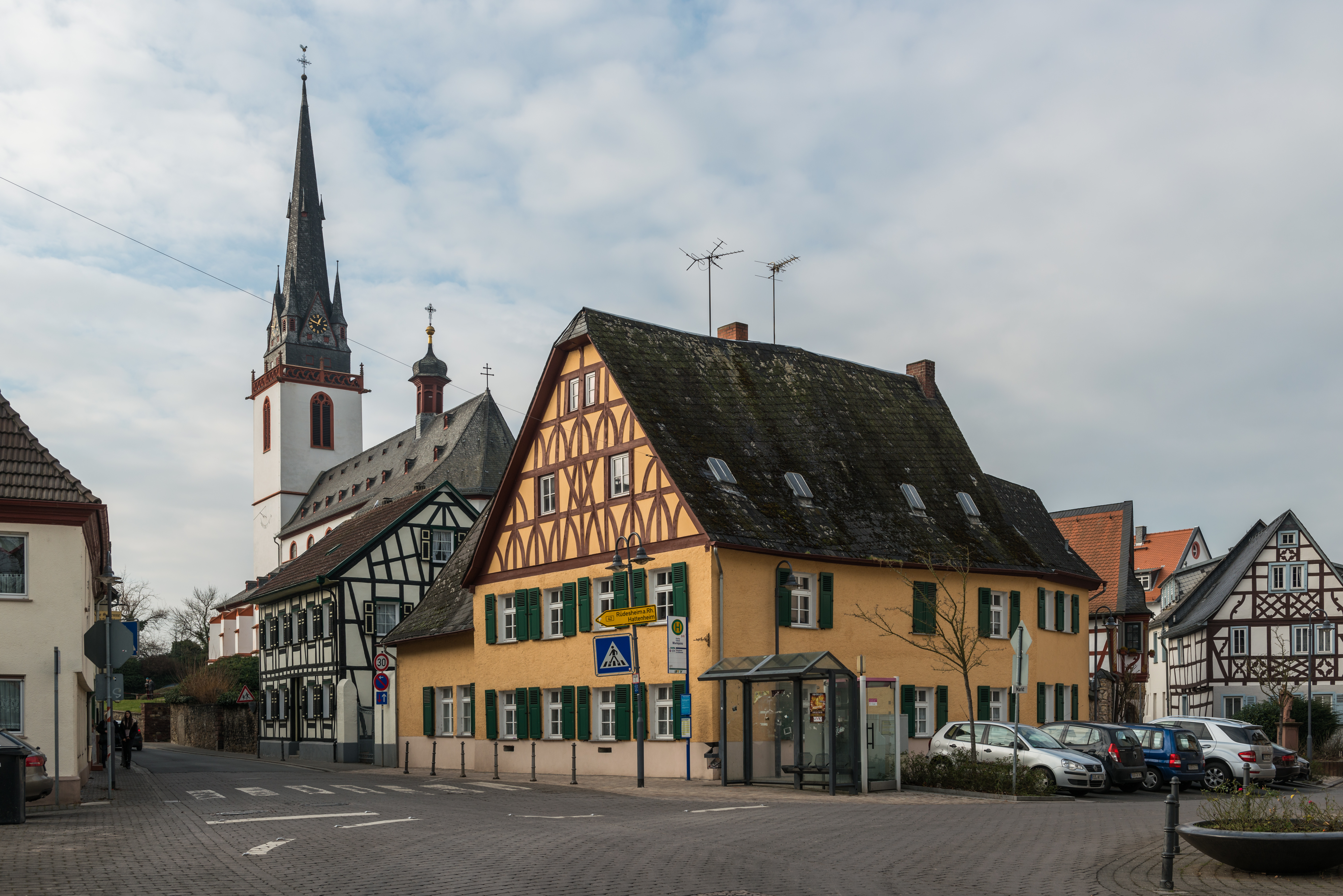
- View of Erbach and St. Markus

- Coat of arms
- Interactive map of Erbach (Rheingau)
- Location within Germany Location within Hesse
- Coordinates: 50°01′17″N 8°05′46″E
- Country: Germany
- State: Hesse
- Admin. region: Darmstadt
- District: Rheingau-Taunus-Kreis
- Town: Eltville

Population
  - Total: 3,400
- Time zone: UTC+01:00 (CET)
  - Summer (DST): UTC+02:00 (CEST)
- Postal codes: 65346
- Dialling codes: 06123
- Vehicle registration: RÜD

Erbach (German pronunciation: [ˈɛʁbax]) is a Stadtteil in Eltville am Rhein, Hesse, Germany. It lies within the Rheingau wine region.

== Geography ==
It is located West of Eltville, Erbach lies where Kissel stream (formerly called Eberbach) flows into the Rhine.

== History ==
The settlement of Erbach was first recorded under the name “Eber Bach” in 1069 in the undated charters of Archbishop Siegfried (1060–1072). Archbishop Friedrich of Mainz (937-54) donated the St. Peter pin in Mainz to the church to Eltville with the tithe to Erbach.

The name of the village was originally spelled like Bach Eberbach. It became known as Erbach in 1313. The name probably originated from the name of a monastery in the same district. During the 12th century the community became a separate district. Erbach has had a magistrate since 1119. The town hall and Siegel church have been in existence since 1429. The detachment from the judicial function of Eltville took place sometime between 1419 and 1429. Between 1770 and 1816, Erbach seat was one of two Amtsvögte of the Rheingau.

The intersection of the Rheingau Chaussee with the Rhine crossing leading to Eberbach, became the center square of the medieval settlement, which was surrounded by larger farms. In the 19th century the construction of the church and the station led to growth in the east and north. A fruit processing plant was supplied by nearby orchards.

The location between Eltville and Erbach, occupied by Eberbach Monastery Draiser with associated lands was eventually developed and the towns grew together. The north includes residential areas, starting from Erbacher Straße (Kühhohl) in 1900, eventually passing beyond the railway line. The expansion of modern Rheinuferstraße from the riverbank settlement expanded growth away from the Rhine.

Coming from the west, the former Manor Castle Reinhardshausen became a resort.

== Notables ==
- Princess Marianne of the Netherlands lived in Schloss Reinhartshausen from 1855 to 1883.
- Prince Frederick of Prussia died in Erbach in 1966.
- Franz Josef Jung, Federal Minister of Defence in Germany from 2005 to 2009, lives here.
