= Eltville =

Eltville Eltville am Rhein
- Town
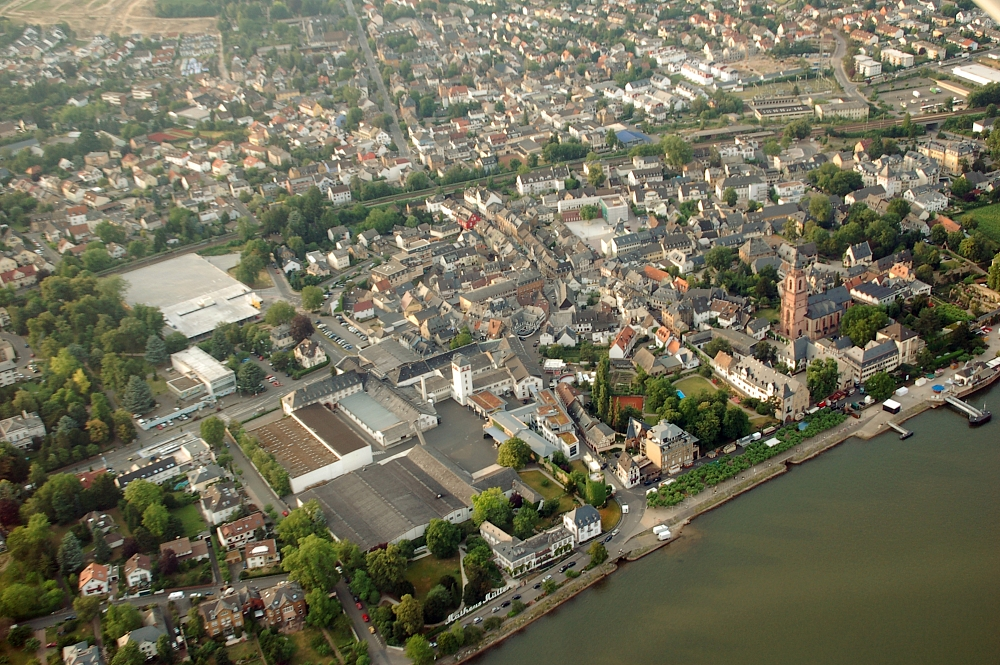
- Aerial view

- Coat of arms

- Location of Eltville within Rheingau-Taunus-Kreis district
- Interactive map of Eltville
- Location within Germany Location within Hesse
- Coordinates: 50°1′32″N 8°7′9″E
- Country: Germany
- State: Hesse
- Admin. region: Darmstadt
- District: Rheingau-Taunus-Kreis
- Subdivisions: 5 districts

Government
  - Mayor (2024–30): Patrick Kunkel (CDU)

Area
  - Total: 46.77 km^{2} (18.06 sq mi)
- Elevation: 95 m (312 ft)

Population (2025-12-31)
  - Total: 16,939
  - Density: 362.2/km^{2} (938.0/sq mi)
- Time zone: UTC+01:00 (CET)
  - Summer (DST): UTC+02:00 (CEST)
- Postal codes: 65343–65347
- Dialling codes: 06123, 06723 (Hattenheim)
- Vehicle registration: RÜD
- Website: www.eltville.de

Eltville am Rhein (German pronunciation: [ˈɛltvɪlə ʔam ˈʁaɪn]; from Alta Villa, Latin for "high estate, high town", corrupted to Eldeville, Elfeld and later Eltville [ˈɛltvɪlə]) is a town in the Rheingau-Taunus-Kreis in the Regierungsbezirk of Darmstadt in Hesse, Germany. It lies on the German Timber-Frame Road (Fachwerkstraße).

Eltville is the largest town in the Rheingau. It bears the nicknames Weinstadt, Sektstadt, Rosenstadt and since 2006 also Gutenbergstadt. Some of Germany's most famous vineyards (Steinberg, Rauenthaler Baiken, Erbacher Marcobrunn) are found within Eltville's municipal limits.

== Geography ==
=== Location ===
Eltville, which belongs culturally to the Rheingau region, lies on the River Rhine, 12 km west-southwest of Wiesbaden.

=== Neighbouring municipalities ===
Eltville borders in the north on the municipalities of Schlangenbad and Kiedrich, in the east on the district-free city of Wiesbaden and the municipality of Walluf, in the south – separated by the Rhine – on the municipalities of Budenheim und Heidesheim and the town of Ingelheim (all three in Mainz-Bingen in Rhineland-Palatinate) and in the west on the town of Oestrich-Winkel.

=== Territorial structure ===
Eltville am Rhein as a municipality consists of five Stadtteile:

- Eltville (initial part and center)
- Erbach
- Hattenheim
- Martinsthal
- Rauenthal

All of them have the status as an Ortsbezirk.

== History ==
The earliest traces of humans settling here go back to the New Stone Age. There has been continuous habitation since the late 4th century. Eltville had its first documentary mention in Vita Bardonis (Bardo's life) from 1058, a biography of Archbishop Bardo of Mainz. In 1329, the castle and the town wall around Eltville were built. On 23 August 1332, Emperor Louis the Bavarian granted Eltville town rights. With the granting of town rights, Eltville ended up being a pawn in the then ongoing dispute between the Emperor and the Pope. Archbishop Baldwin, one of Emperor Louis's followers and administrator of the Mainz monastery, was the one who asked for Eltville to be raised to town. From 1347 to 1480, Eltville was the residence of the Archbishops of Mainz. In 1349, Günther of Schwarzburg was defeated in his bid for the German throne at the Siege of Eltville. From Dietrich Schenk von Erbach, Archbishop of Mainz (1434–1459), the outlying centre of Erbach presumably got its name.

== Politics ==
=== Town council ===
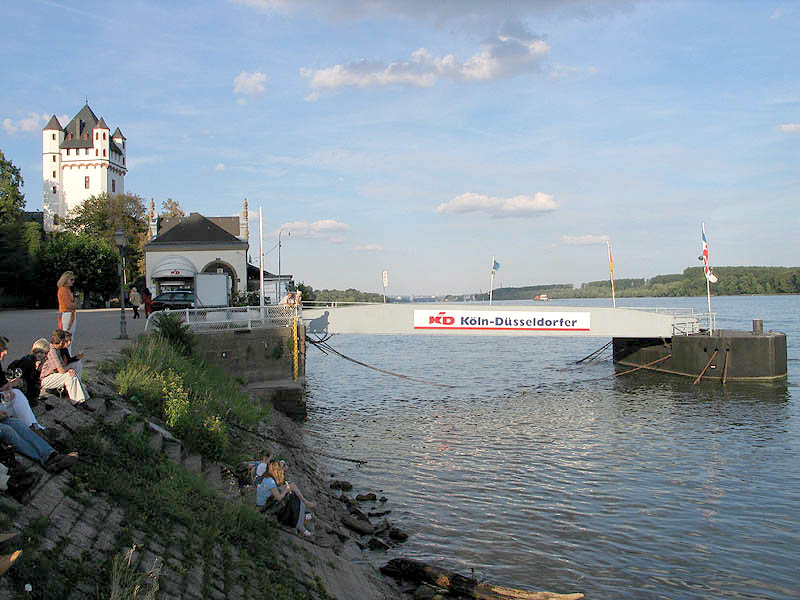
Tower at Eltville Castle

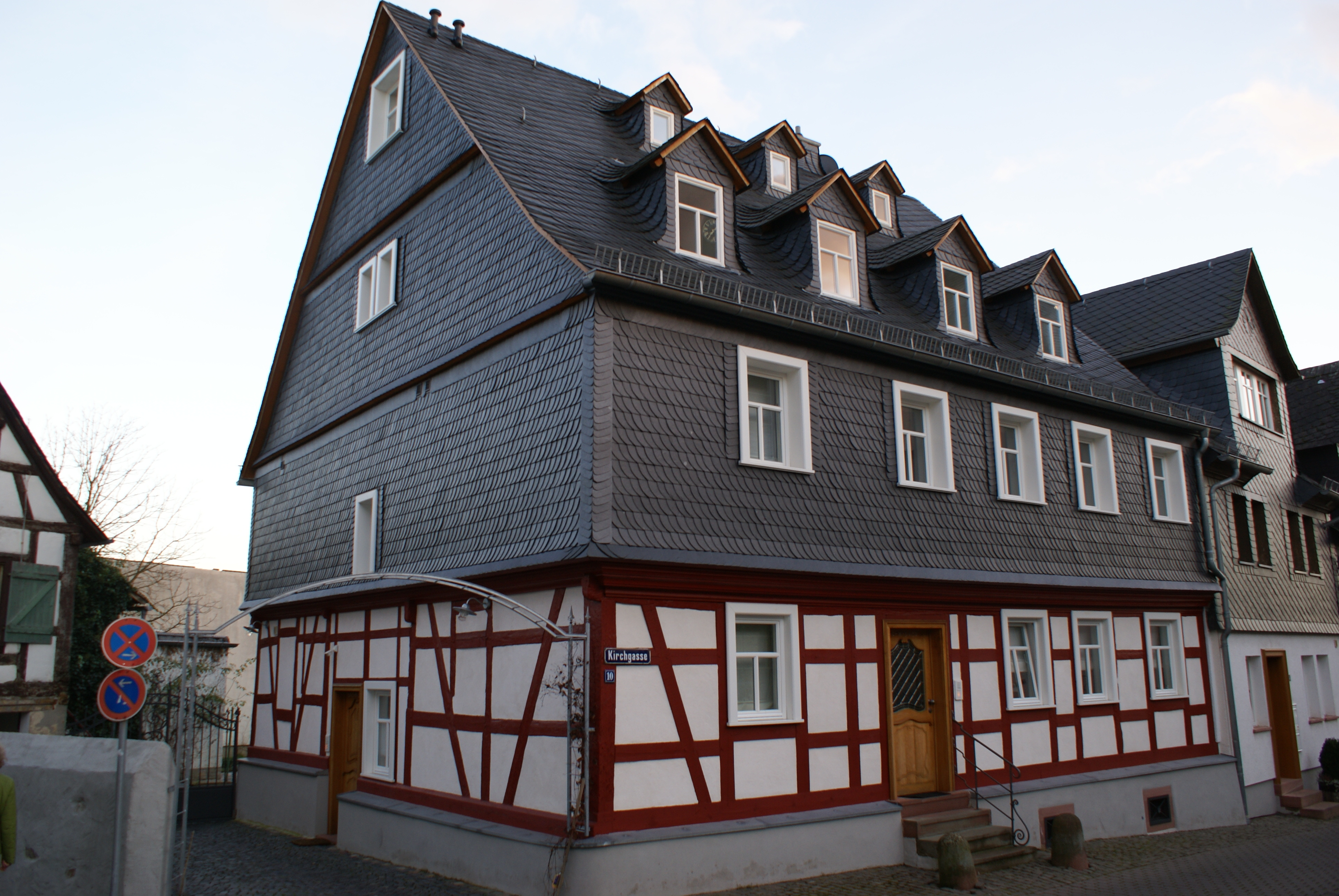
View of the village of Rauenthal

In the municipal election held on 14 March 2021, the 37 seats were distributed as follows:

Parties and voter communities		% 2021	Seats 2021	% 2006	Seats 2006	% 2001	Seats 2001
CDU	Christian Democratic Union	44.64	16	44.0	16	45.5	17
SPD	Social Democratic Party	15.10	6	30.1	11	29.2	11
GREENS	Bündnis 90/Die Grünen	25.84	10	9.8	4	10.7	4
FDP	Free Democratic Party	0	0	5.0	2	5.2	2
BL	Bürgerliste	0	0	7.0	3	5.4	2
REP	The Republicans	0	0	4.1	1	–	–
WOK	Wählergemeinschaft Opitz-Kaldenberg	0	0	–	–	4.0	1
BLL	Bürgerlich Liberale Liste	8.62	3				
AfD	Alternative für Deutschland	5.80	2				
Total		100	37	100.0	37	100.0	37
Voter turnout in %		58.42		54.4		51.3	

=== Town partnerships ===
The town of Eltville am Rhein maintains partnerships with these places:

- Montrichard, Loir-et-Cher, France
- Arzens, Aude, France
- Passignano sul Trasimeno, Perugia, Umbria, Italy

== Culture and sightseeing ==
=== Buildings ===
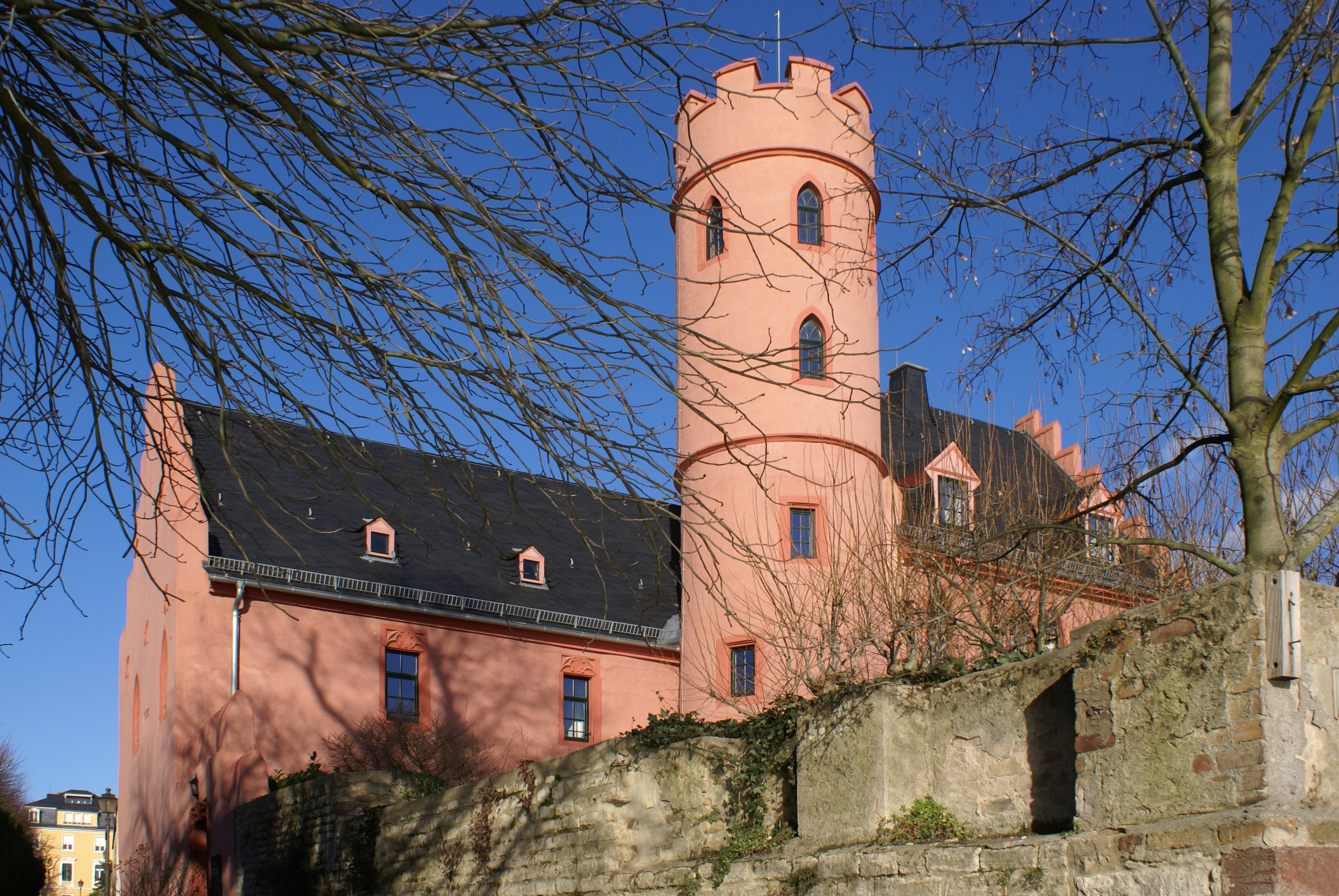
Crass Castle in Eltville

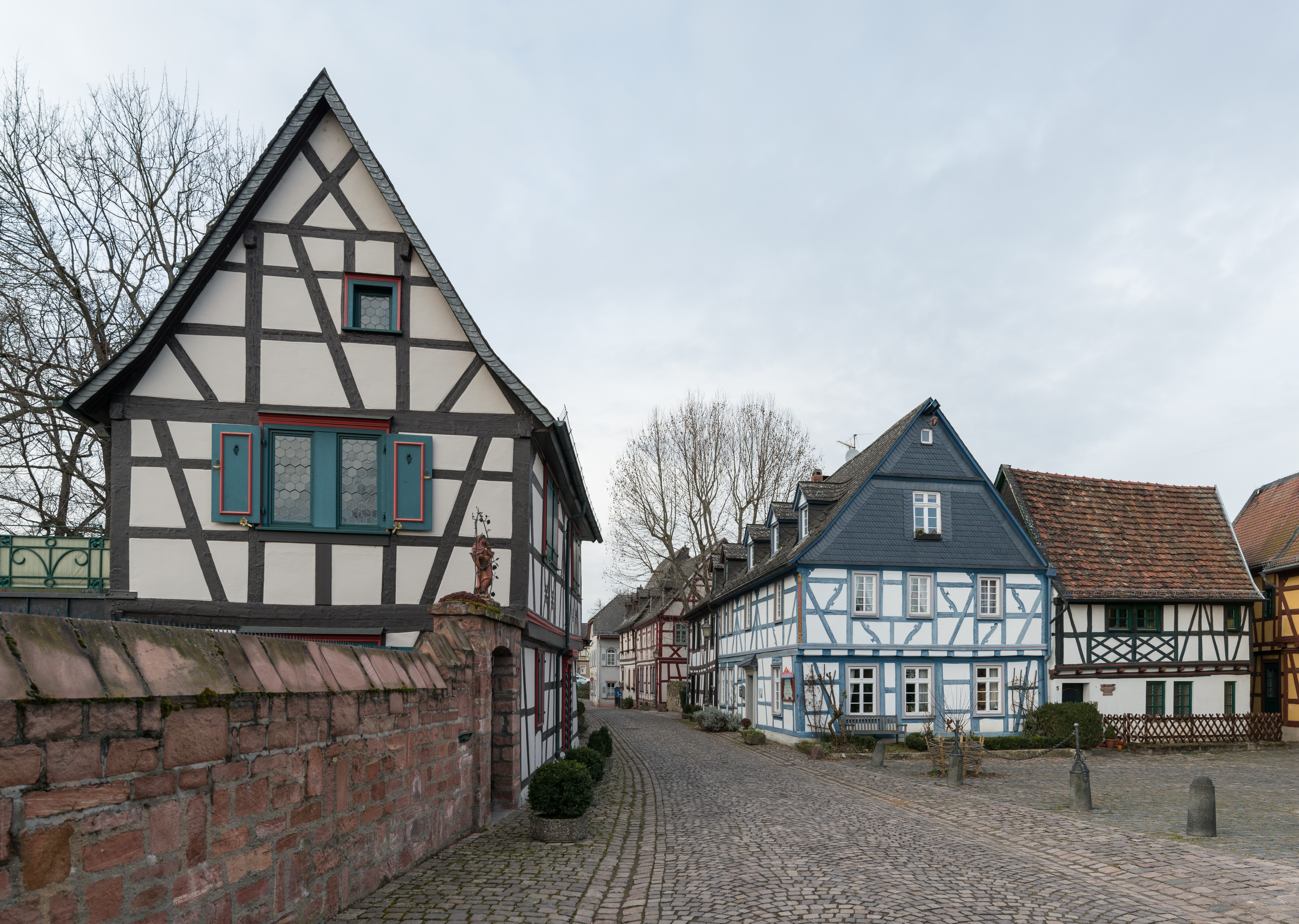
Eltville's Burgstrasse with typical timber-frame houses

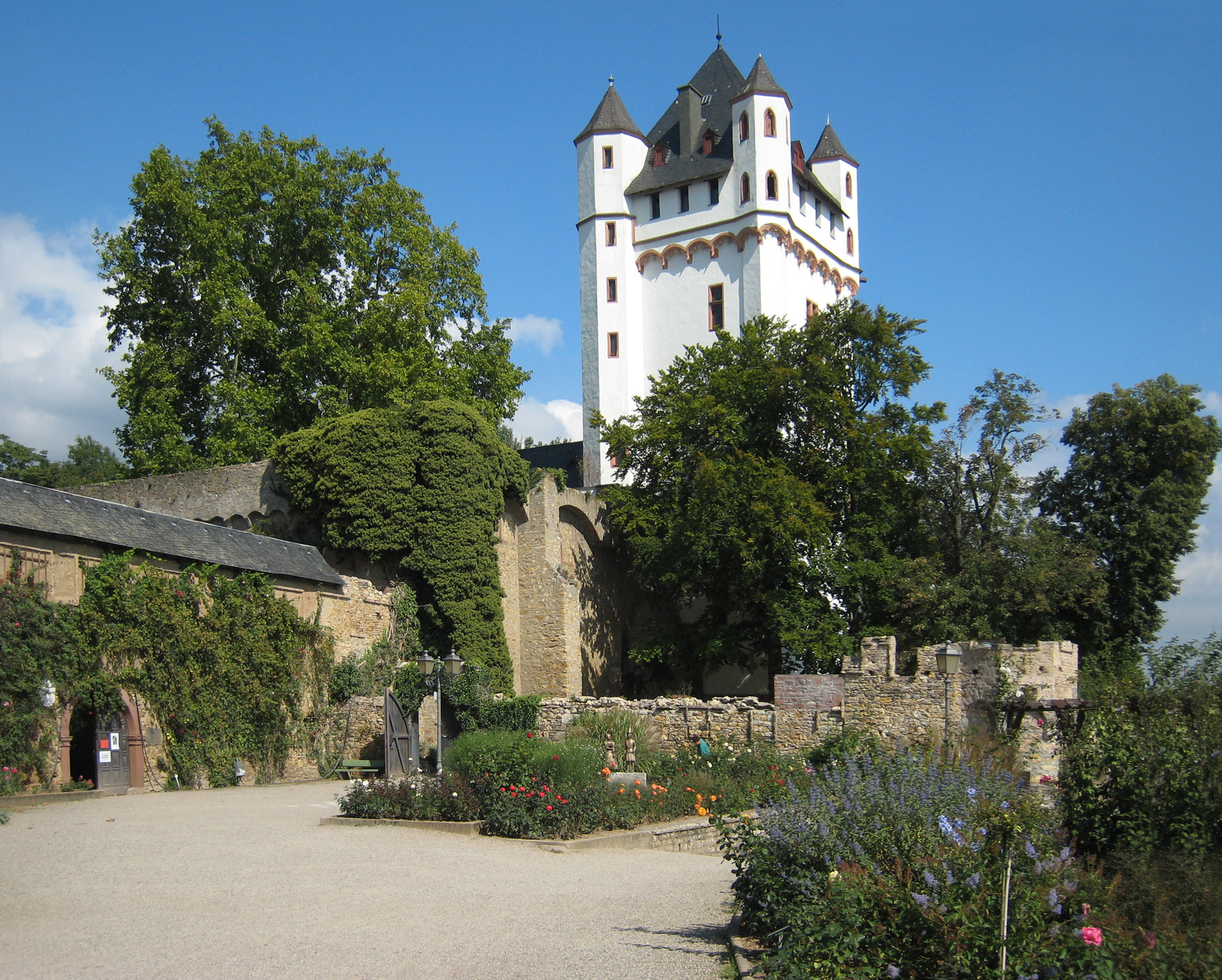
Eltville Castle

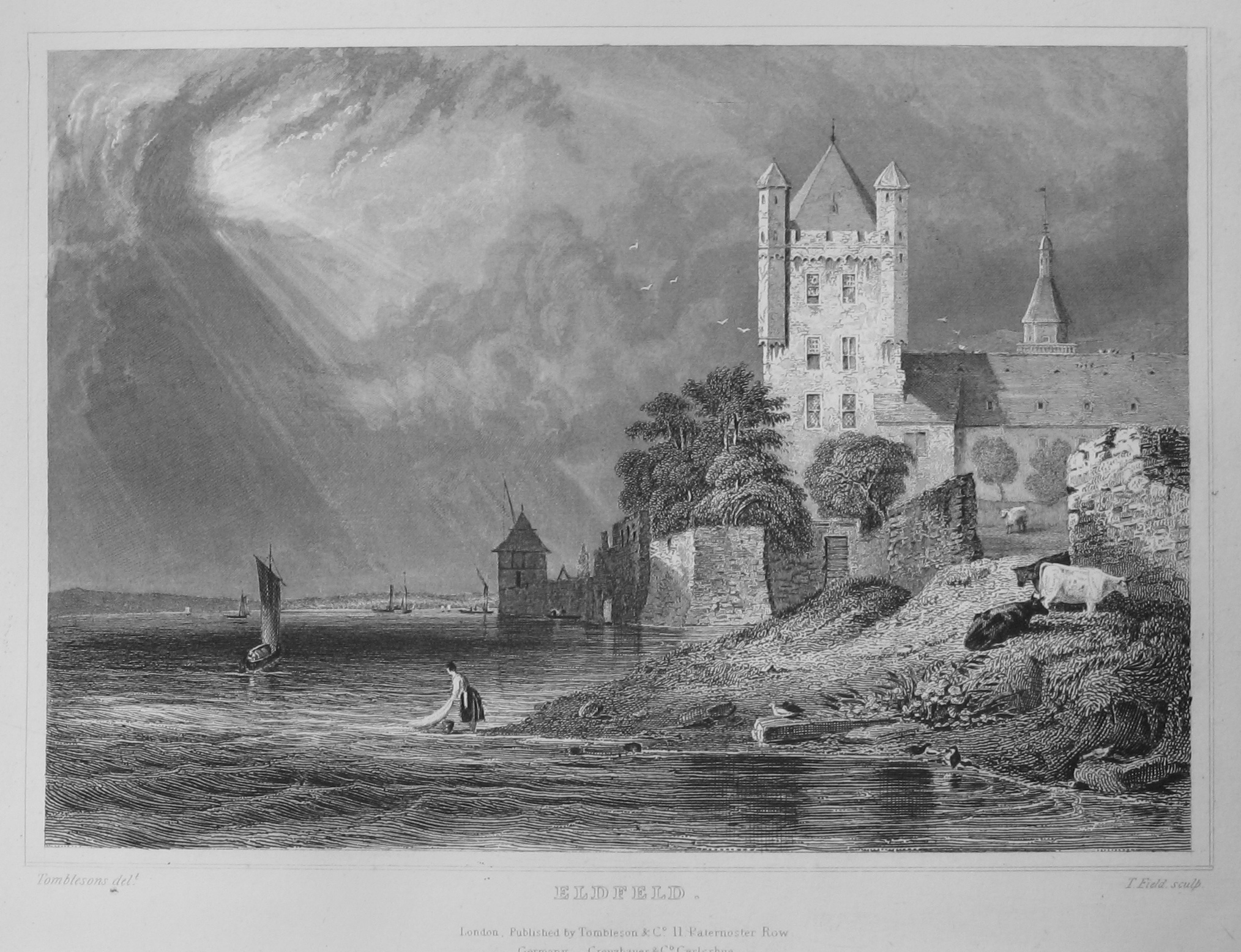
Eltville Castle c. 1832 (engraving after William Tombleson)

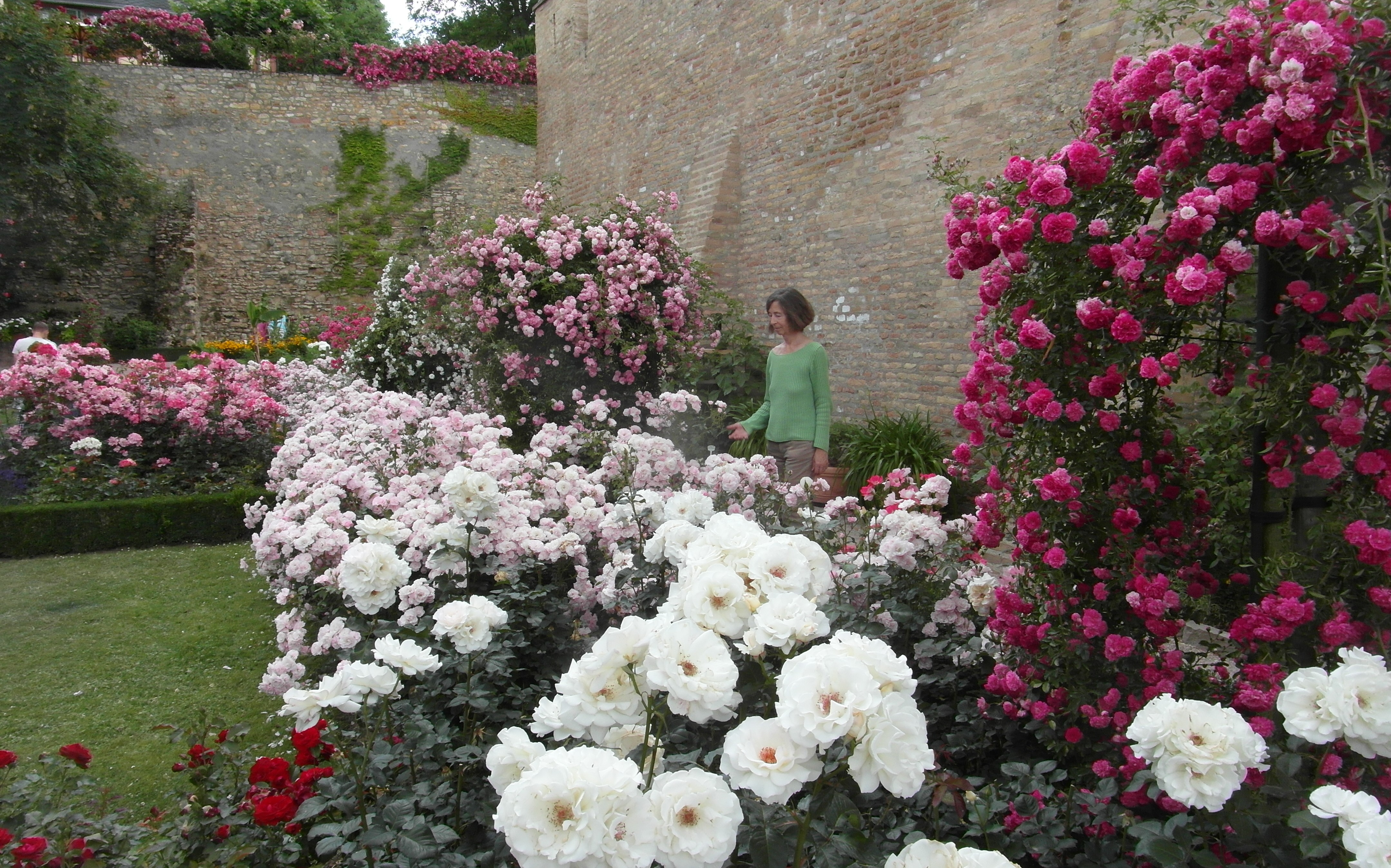
Rosengarten, a rose garden between the high walls of the Eltville Castle

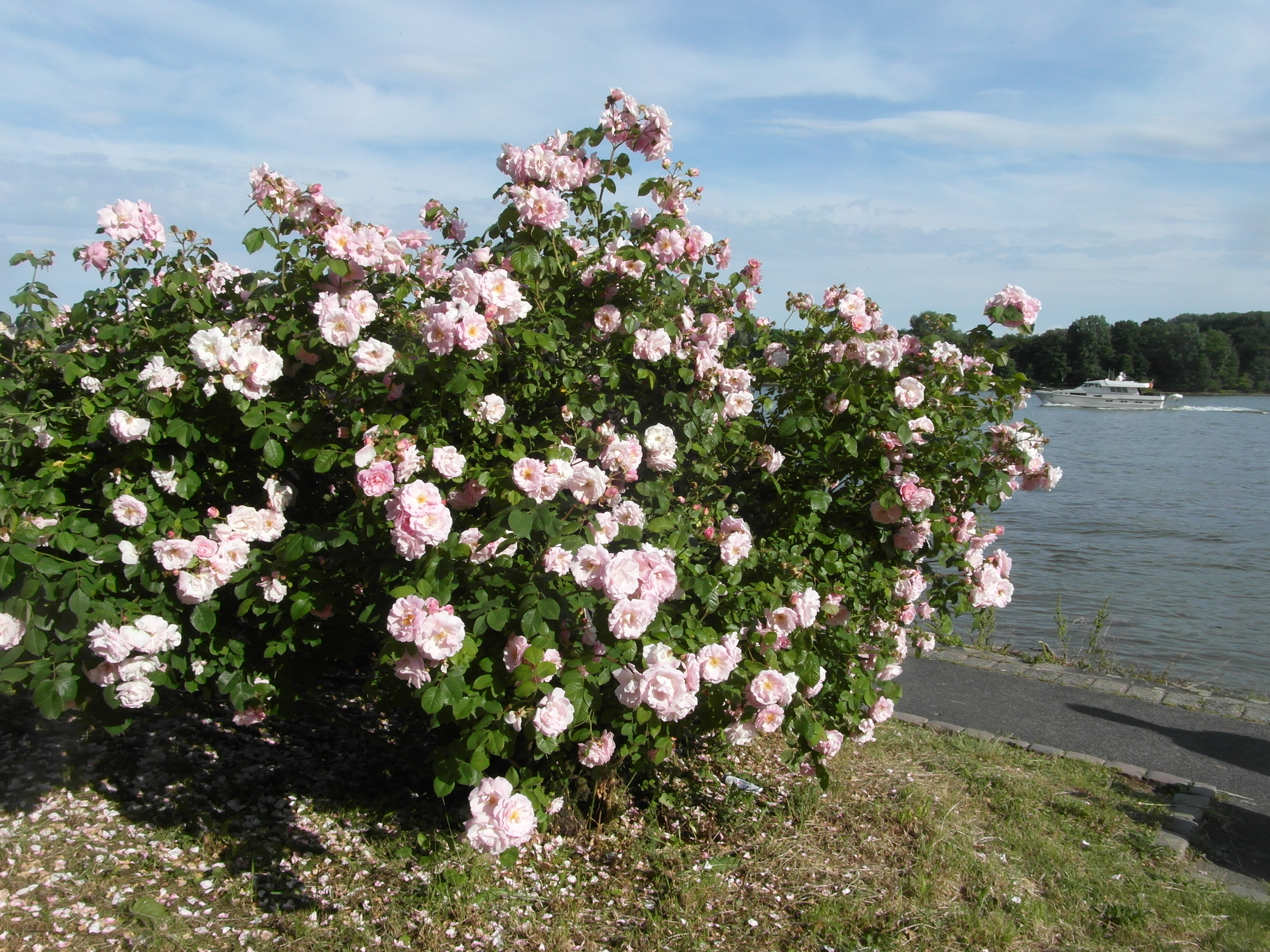
Roses on the banks of the Rhine

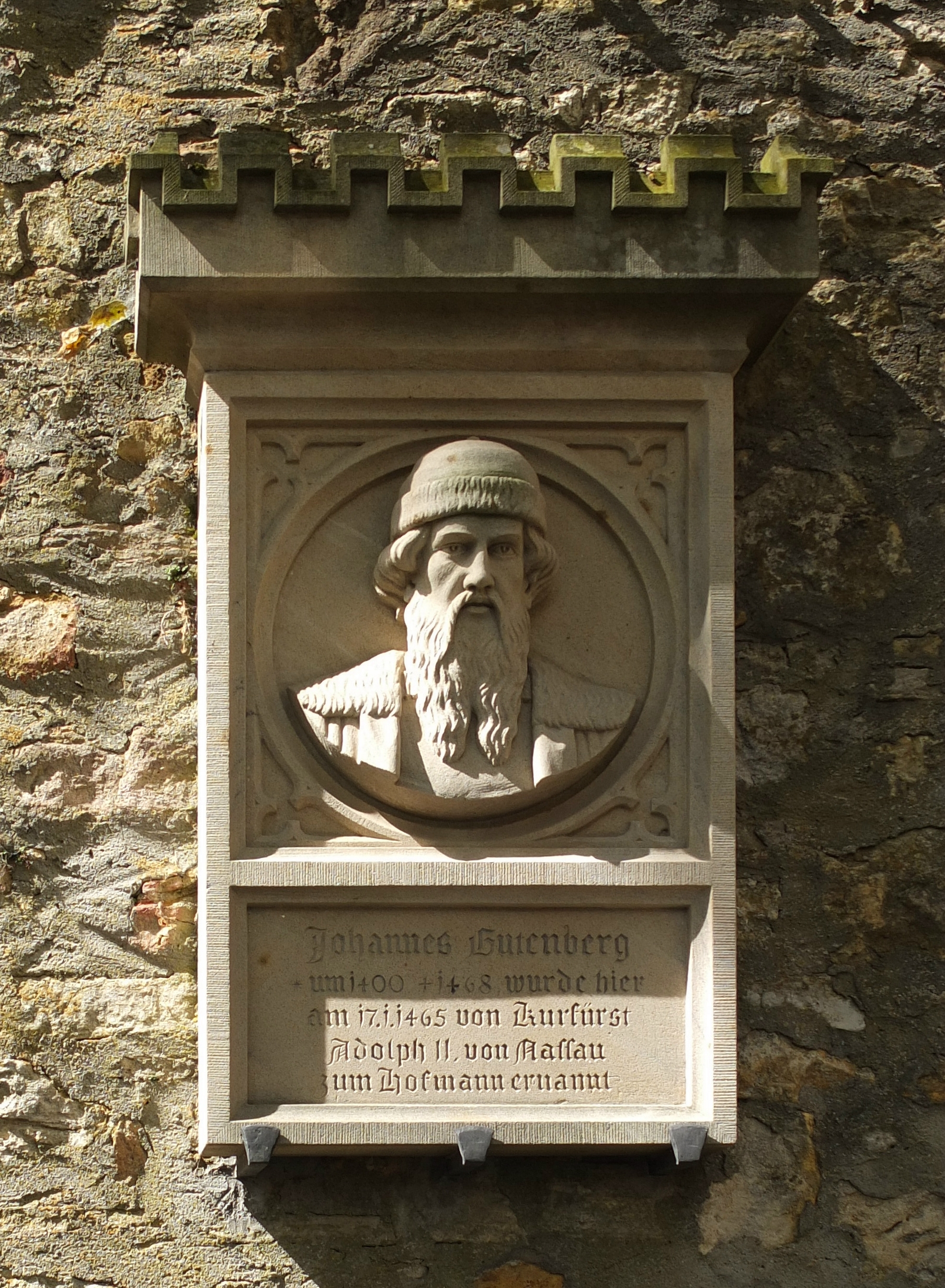
Commemorative plaque for Johannes Gutenberg

- Eltville Castle (Burg Eltville) from the 14th century, with a rose garden
- Remains of town fortifications
- timber-frame from the 16th and 18th centuries
- Eberbach Abbey, former Cistercian monastery
- Clos of the Steinberg, Germany's best known clos (enclosed vineyard)
- Schloss Reinhartshausen (palace, now hotel)
- St. Peter und Paul, parish church from the 14th century
- Pfarrkirche St. Markus (St. Mark's parish church) in Erbach from the 15th century and the Protestant church in Erbach from the 19th century.
- Kulturkirche Martinsthal (culture church)
- Crass Castle

=== Regular events ===
- Gutenberg-Winter in Eltville – each year in January and February
- Rheingauer Schlemmerwoche (gluttons' week) and Days of Open Wine Cellars with many wine samplings – late April/early May
- Rosentage in Eltville (rose days) – each year on the first weekend in June
- Erdbeerfest in Erbach (strawberry festival) – each year in mid-June
- Sektfest Eltville – each year on the first weekend in July
- Martinsthaler Weinfest – always on the second weekend in July
- Rheingau Musik Festival – International Music Festival, in summer
- Rauenthaler Weinfest – on the second or third weekend in August
- Burghofspiele – in summer
- Kappeskerb/Weinlesefest in Eltville (kermis/wine harvest festival) – each year on the last weekend in October
- Rheingau Pokal ("cup" in taekwondo, fighting) – each year in mid-November
- Musikalischer Winter in Eltville – each year on each Thursday from mid-November to late April
- Christmas Market in the Old Town – on the second weekend in December.

== Economy and infrastructure ==
=== Economy and tourism ===
Eltville is developed for tourists, and well known for its wine and sekt production, which can be sampled at many wineries and Straußwirtschaften (seasonal wine shops). Eltville is the headquarters of MM-Sektkellerei (which today belongs to Rotkäppchen-Sekt), Hessische Staatsweingüter Kloster Eberbach (Hessian State Wine Estates of Eberbach Monastery), and Sektmanufaktur Schloss Vaux, as well as the biggest industrial employer in the Rheingau, Jean Müller GmbH Elektrotechnische Fabrik. Eltville is one of Germany's ten "Rosenstädte" (rose towns).

=== Transport ===
Eltville lies on Bundesstraße 42, which towards the east is built like an Autobahn and near Walluf seamlessly joins the A 66. Eltville station also lies on the East Rhine Railway, which connects Frankfurt and Wiesbaden to Koblenz and Cologne and belongs to the Rhein-Main-Verkehrsverbund. On the Rhine's bank are several landing stages for, among others, the Köln-Düsseldorfer Deutsche Rheinschiffahrt, a well known Rhine passenger ship operator.

=== Education ===
- Freiherr-vom-Stein-Schule (primary school in the main town)
- Gutenberg-Schule (Realschule in the main town)
- Gymnasium Eltville (in the main town)
- Sonnenblumenschule (primary school in Erbach)
- Waldbachschule (primary school in Hattenheim)
- Otfried-Preußler-Schule (primary school in Rauenthal)
- Mediathek Eltville (public municipal library)
- IREBS Immobilier Akademie, Real Estate Management academy situated in Kloster Eberbach

== Notable people ==
- Johannes Gutenberg was named on 17 January 1465 a courtly nobleman by the Archbishop and Elector Adolph II of Nassau, who at the time resided in the Electoral castle at Eltville. Presumably under Gutenberg's guidance, the Brothers Bechtermünz founded a small printing shop. This published in 1467 the Vocabularius ex quo, a Latin dictionary. In this workshop, Thomas Aquinas's Summa de articulis fidei (1472) was also reprinted. This made Eltville one of the cradle towns of book printing. In the castle tower, a memorial recalls Gutenberg. Gutenberg's brother, Friele Gensfleisch, lived in Eltville from 1434 until his death in 1447. The Gensfleisch-Haus still stands today right next to the castle.
- Gebeno von Eberbach, clergyman
- Julius Koch (28 February 1912, Frankfurt – 2 July 1991, Eltville), German drink researcher, oenologist and food chemist.
- Georg Herber (1763–1833 in Eltville), for many years President of the second chamber of The Estates of Duchy of Nassau

=== Sons and daughters of the town ===
- Michael Apitz (born 1965), graphic and comic strip artist
- Franz Josef Jung (born 1949), German politician (CDU) and Federal Minister of Defence in the first Merkel cabinet
- Augustinus Kilian (1856–1930 in Limburg an der Lahn) was from 1913 until his death in 1930 Roman Catholic Bishop of the Bishopric of Limburg an der Lahn.
- Heinrich Köppler (1925–1980), German politician (CDU), candidate at the Landtag election in North Rhine-Westphalia, 1980.
- Wilhelm Kreis (1873–1955), architect
- Eduard Kremer (1881–1948), politician
- Ernst Freiherr Langwerth von Simmern (1865–1942), German diplomat, ambassador in Madrid and Imperial commissar for the occupied Rhenish areas in Koblenz
- Ferdinand Wilhelm Emil Roth (1853–1924), historical researcher
- Andreas Scholl (born 1967), countertenor
- Bernhard Schott (1748–1809), music publisher, founded the music publishing house Schott Music in Mainz in 1770
- Jennifer Braun (born 1991), singer, lives in Eltville

== Photo gallery ==
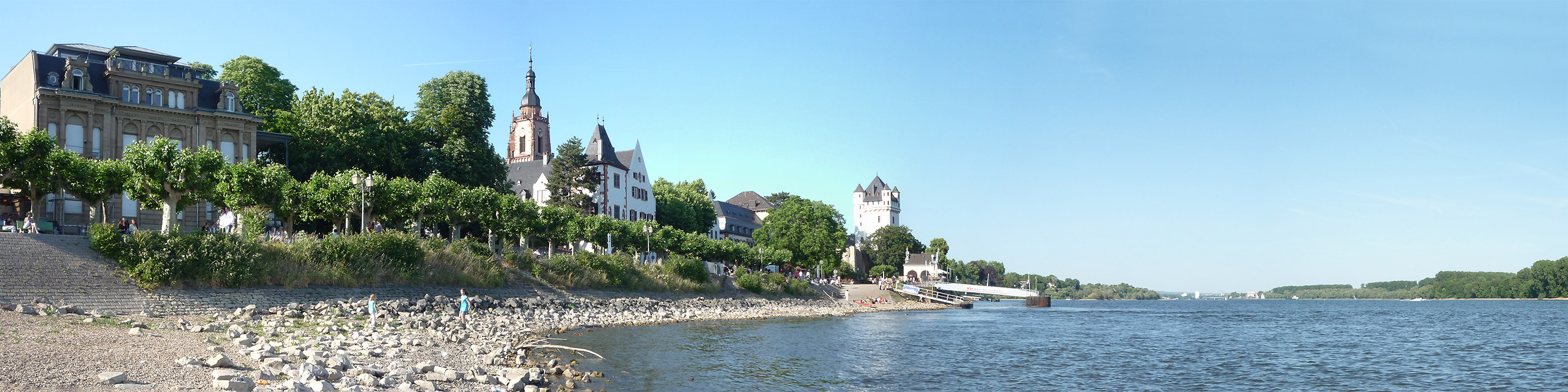
Panoramic view of Eltville am Rhein

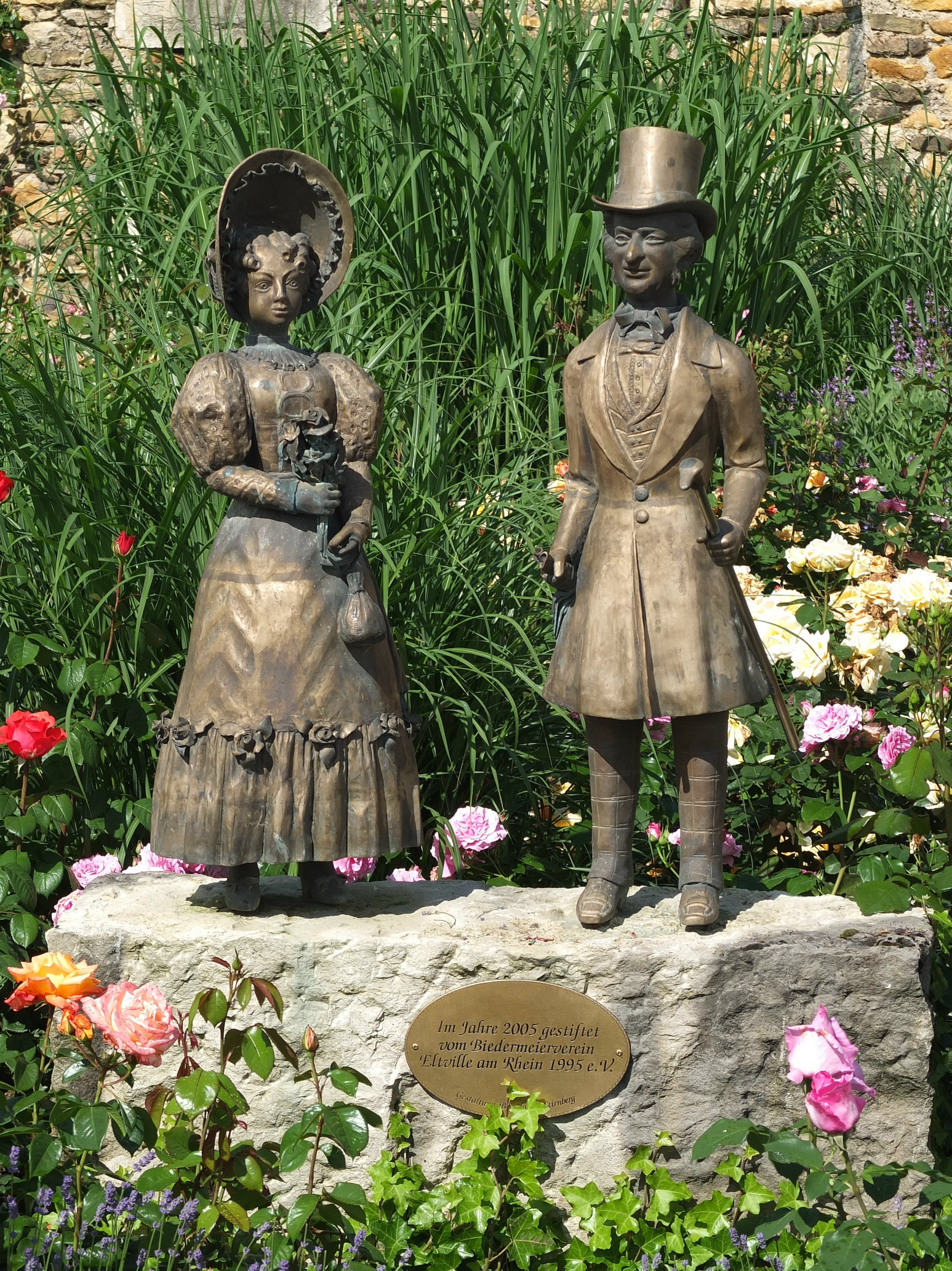
Bronze sculpture of a Biedermeier couple

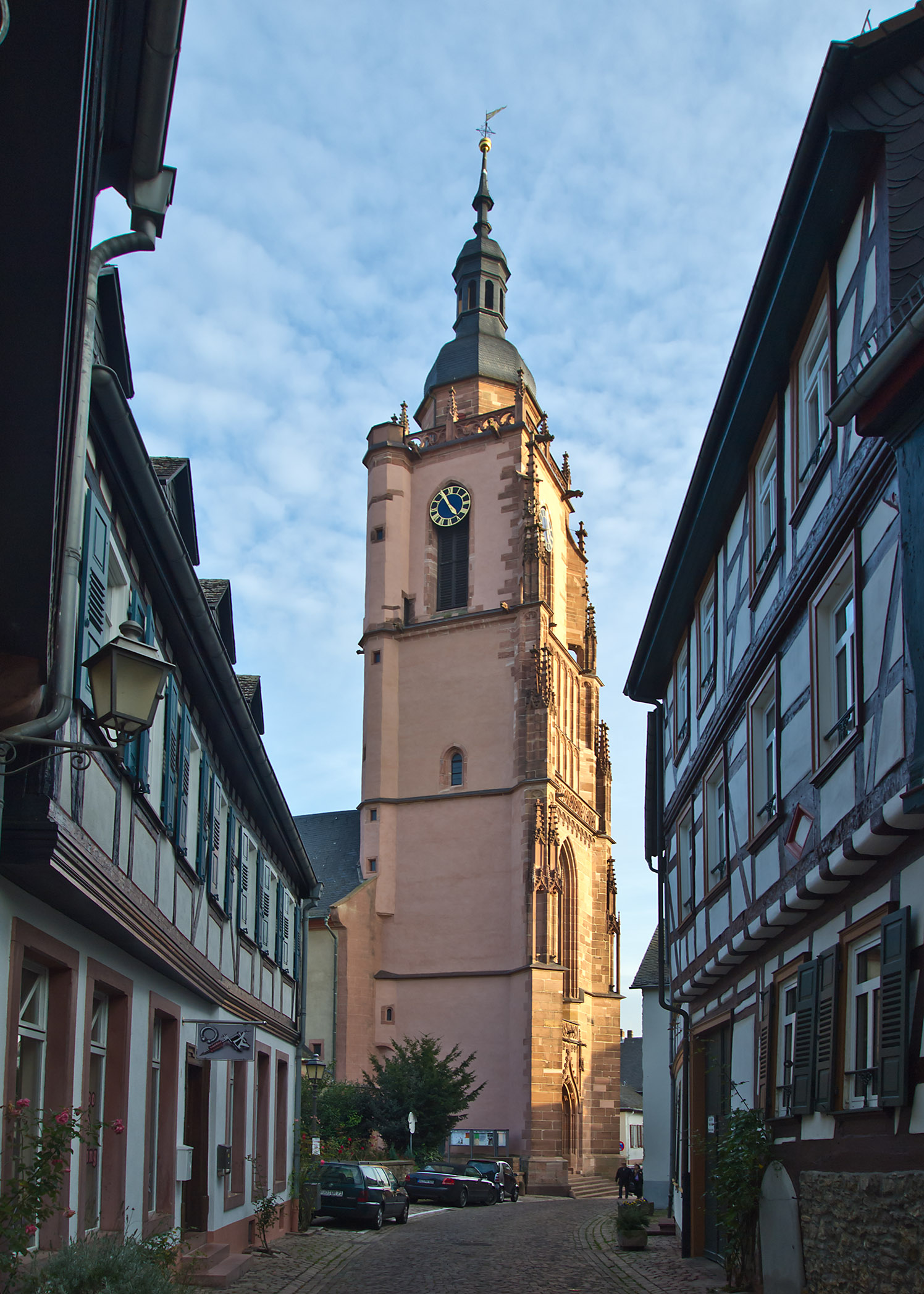
St. Peter's and Paul's parish church

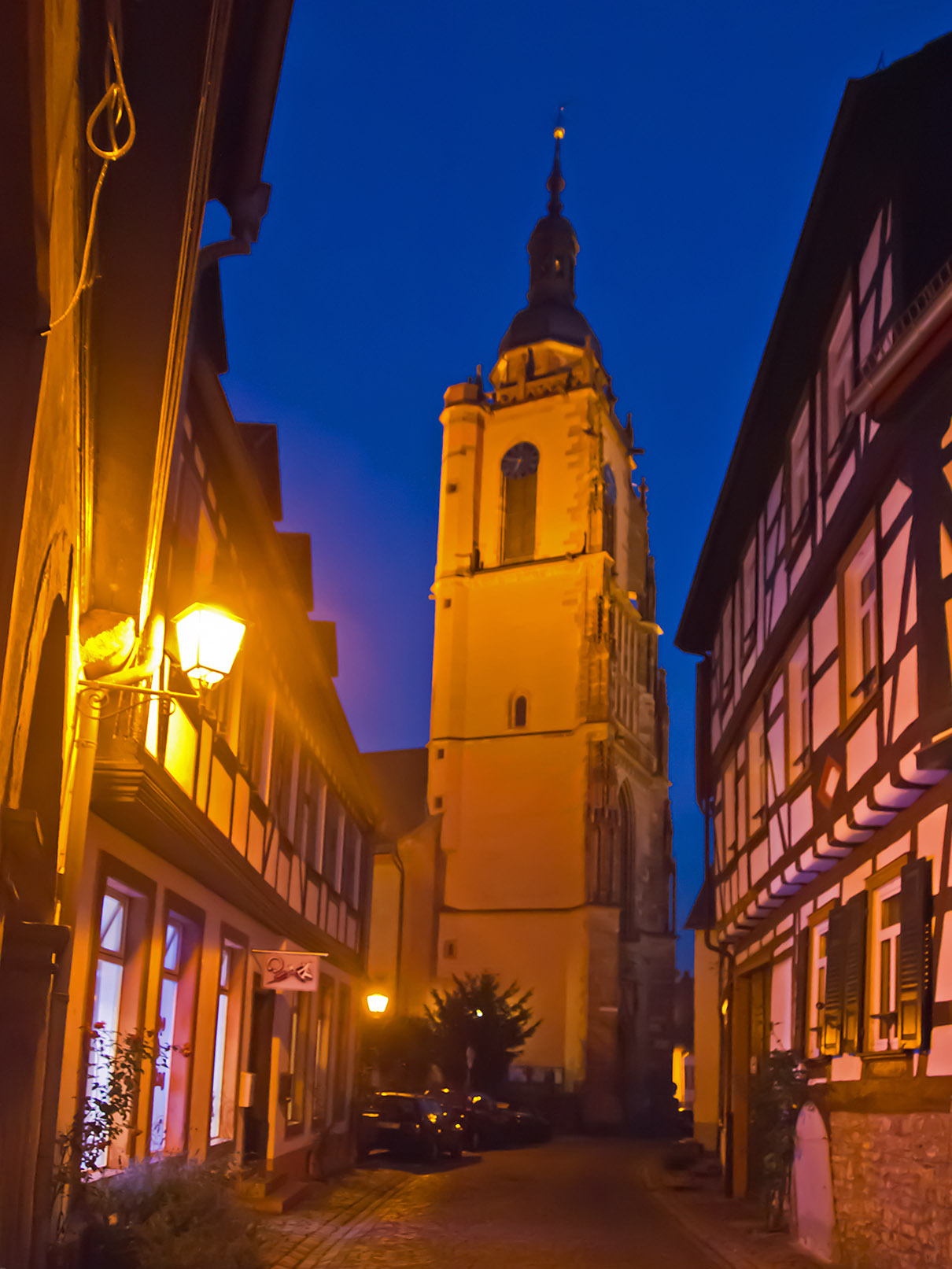
St. Peter's and Paul's parish church

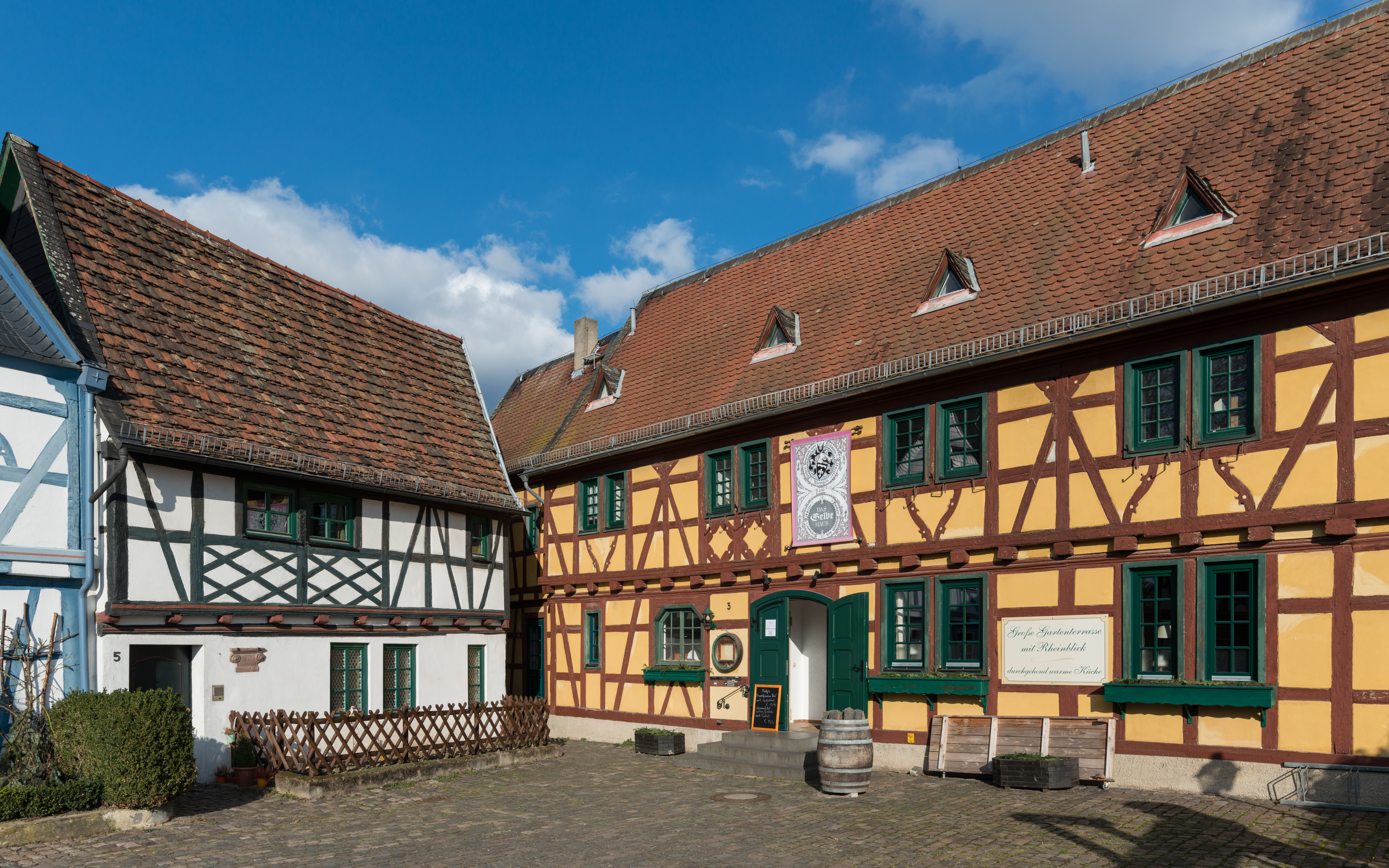
Historic half-timbered buildings
