= Heitmann =

- Language: German

Origin
- Region of origin: Germany

Heitmann is a German surname. Notable people with the surname include:

- Amanda Heitmann (born 1998), Danish politician
- Anne Heitmann, German poet and writer
- Axel C. Heitmann (born 1959), German business executive
- Edward Heitmann (1878–1934), Australian politician
- Eric Heitmann (born 1980), American footballer
- John H. Heitmann (1842–1894), American politician
- Katrin Heitmann, German-American cosmologist
- Linda Heitmann (born 1982), German politician
- René Heitmann (born 1942), Danish modern pentathlete
- Steffen Heitmann (1944–2024), German politician

== See also ==
- Heitman
