= Vocabularius ex quo =

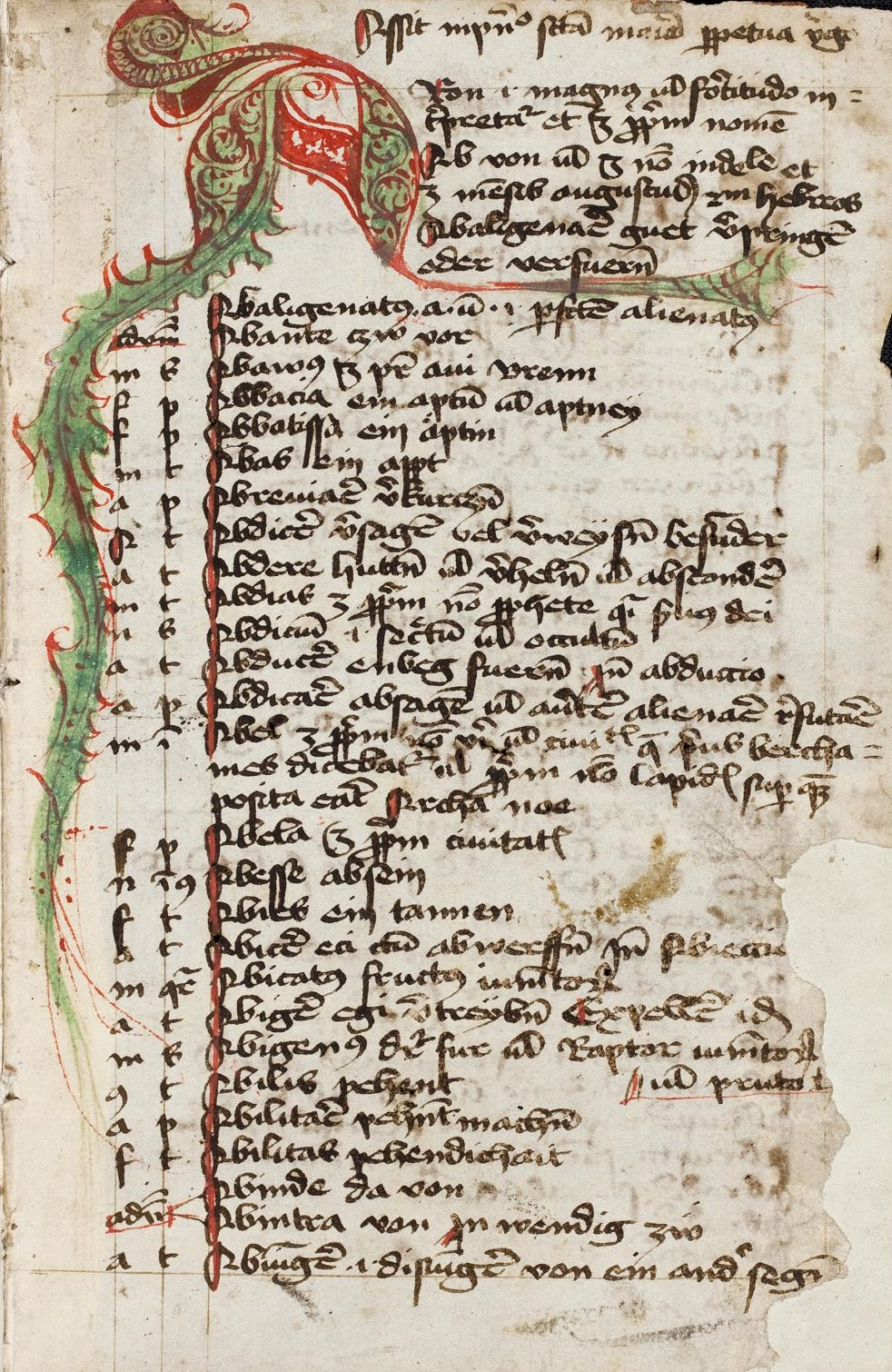
Vocabularius ex quo extract

Vocabularius ex quo is a 15th century Latin-German dictionary compiled by the Bechtermünz Brothers of Eltville am Rhein, with the assistance of an aging and bankrupt Johannes Gutenberg. The manuscript consists of two complementary parts, one from 1421 and the other from 1450. More than 270 surviving manuscripts and some fifty editions remain. It was the most commonly used late medieval alphabetical dictionary in Germany. It dates from the late 14th century and, spreading all over the then German speaking countries, and kept being copied until the last decades of the 15th century.

It was meant by its compiler-author to enable the middle class to read and literally understand the Scriptures and other Latin texts.

== Edition ==
- Frühneuhochdeutsches Glossenwörterbuch. Index zum deutschen Wortgut des ›Vocabolarius ex quo‹. Auf Grund der Vorarbeiten von Erltraud Auer, Regina Frisch, Reinhard Pawis und Hans-Jürgen Stahl unter Mitwirkung von Markus Stock herausgegeben von Klaus Grubmüller. Niemeyer, Tübingen 2001 (= Texte und Textgeschichte. Vol. 27).
