= St. Peter und Paul, Eltville =

Coordinates: 50.024811°N 8.121223°E

St. Peter und Paul
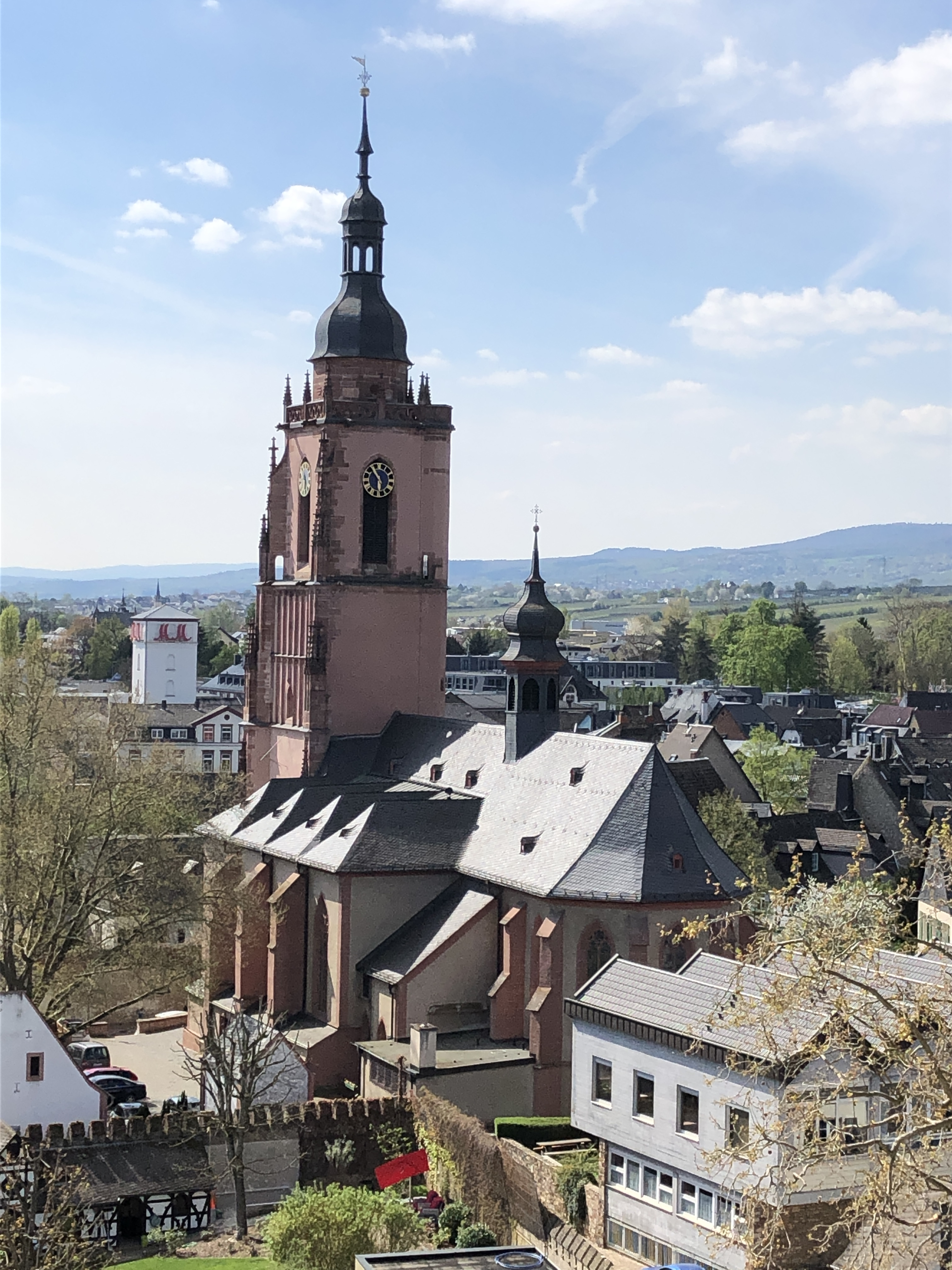
- St. Peter und Paul, Eltville, in 2022
- St. Peter und Paul
- Location: Eltville, Hesse, Germany
- Denomination: Catholic
- Website: www.pastoraler-raum-eltville.de

History
- Dedication: Saint Peter, Saint Paul

Architecture
- Style: late Gothic
- Groundbreaking: 1305

Administration
- Diocese: Limburg

St. Peter und Paul, Eltville is the name of a Catholic church and parish in Eltville, Rheingau-Taunus-Kreis, Germany, dedicated to Saints Peter and Paul. The parish is part of the Diocese of Limburg. Several parishes were merged into St. Peter und Paul in 2015.

== History ==
Earlier church buildings seemed no longer sufficient in the 14th century when Eltville became a residence of the archbishop of Mainz.

The present church was probably begun in 1305, and the choir was ready to be used from 1359. The tower of the last earlier church was first integrated in the new building.

The church was expanded from 1420 by a new side aisle. The high tower in the west was added at about the same time.

The tower burned down after hit by lightning; it was restored in 1686 with a Baroque roof by cathedral builder Veit Schneider from Mainz. Another fire damaged the roof of the nave in 1782, which was replaced with and added steeple.

=== Modern history ===
The parish became part of the Diocese of Limburg. In 2015 several parishes were merged into St. Peter und Paul.
