= Heitman =

Heitman is a surname. Notable people with the surname include:

- Betty Heitman (1929-1994), American activist
- Dana Heitman (born 1966), American musician
- Jack Heitman (1906–1977), Australian politician
- Nils Peter Laberg Heitman (1874–1938), Norwegian physician and civil servant

== See also ==
- Heitman Analytics
- Heitmann
