= Anne Heitmann =

German poet

Anne Heitmann (born in Münster, North Rhine-Westphalia) is a poet and writer.

== Biography ==
She moved after her marriage to Frankfurt. Today she lives in Hochheim am Main. Since 1980, Heitmann's poetry and prose have appeared in a number of magazines and anthologies. Her interest in political concerns have been long-standing; she was active in local politics for almost two decades. This interest has manifested itself in some of her writings, for in addition to short stories, poems, and contributions to entertainment sections in newspapers she has written socio-political pieces the provide critical commentaries on the age we live in. Heitmann has published three collections of poetry: Morgen vielleicht kann ich lächeln (Maybe I can laugh tomorrow), ...auch wenn ich leise bin (...also if I am quiet), and Stolpersteine (Stumbling Blocks). The focus in her poetry is on age, loss, memories, reflections, and politics.

== Sources ==
- Moeller, Jack; Adolph, Winnifred R.; Mabee, Barbara; Berger, Simone (2002). Kaleidoskop (6 ed.). Boston, MA: Houghton Mifflin Company. ISBN 0-618-10312-0.
