= Hetman (train) =

Fast train system in Poland

Hetman is the name of a fast train system in Poland.

== Route ==
Hetman uses two trains to cross almost the whole length of southern and western Poland. It runs on the Zamość - Gorzów Wielkopolski,Hrubieszów-Wrocław and Hrubieszów-Krakówroute, via Stalowa Wola, Tarnobrzeg, Rzeszów, Kraków, Katowice, Gliwice, Wrocław, Poznań, and Krzyż Wielkopolski. It takes 17 hours to cross that distance.

According to the 2009 PKP schedule, Hetman consists of two trains, which meet at the Dębica junction. One runs from Zamość, via Stalowa Wola and Tarnobrzeg. The other runs from Rzeszów. The combined rail distance between Zamość and Gorzów Wielkopolski is 895 kilometers.
