= Rheingau =

Region of Hesse, Germany

County of the Rhine district; The Rhinegraviate Grafschaft der Rheingau; Rheingrafschaft
- c. 937–1866
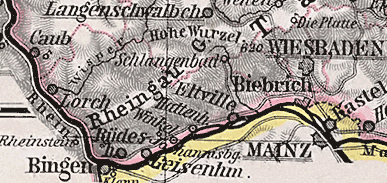
- The Rheingau shown on a 1905 map of Hesse-Nassau
- Status: State of the Frankish Empire; State of the Holy Roman Empire
- Capital: Rheingrafenstein in Kreuznach; later Eltville
- Government: Principality
- Historical era: Middle Ages
  - Established: c. 937
  - Donation of Verona: given to Abp Mainz: 983
  - Archbishopric dissolved; to Duchy of Nassau: 1806
  - Prussia annexes Nassau into Hesse-Nassau: 1866
Preceded by	Succeeded by
Monogram of Charlemagne / Kingdom of the Franks	Kingdom of Prussia

The Rheingau (German: [ˈʁaɪnɡaʊ]; lit. 'Rhine County') is a region on the northern side of the Rhine between the German towns of Wiesbaden and Lorch near Frankfurt, reaching from the Western Taunus to the Rhine. It is situated in the German state of Hesse and is part of the Rheingau-Taunus-Kreis administrative district. It is famous for Rheingau wines, especially the "Rheingauer Riesling," and its many taverns.

== History ==
The Rheingau was a Gau or county of the Frankish Empire, bordered by the Niddagau, the Maingau, the Oberrheingau, and the Lahngau; the counts of the Rheingau were known as Rhinegraves. The first Rhinegrave on record is Hato VI (937–960). Since the Ingelheim Imperial Palace was on the other bank of the Rhine, important imperial assemblies have taken place in the region since Charlemagne.

In 983, Otto II, Holy Roman Emperor, gave the Rheingau, together with other territories, to the Archbishopric of Mainz during the Diet of Verona. When the Archbishopric was dissolved in 1806, the Rheingau was given to the Duchy of Nassau.

== Gallery ==
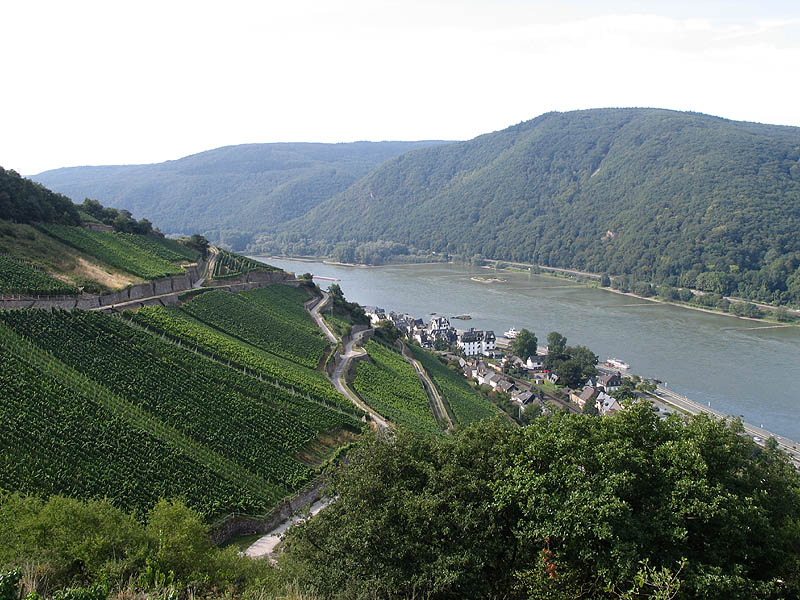
Rheingau valley with the Rhine

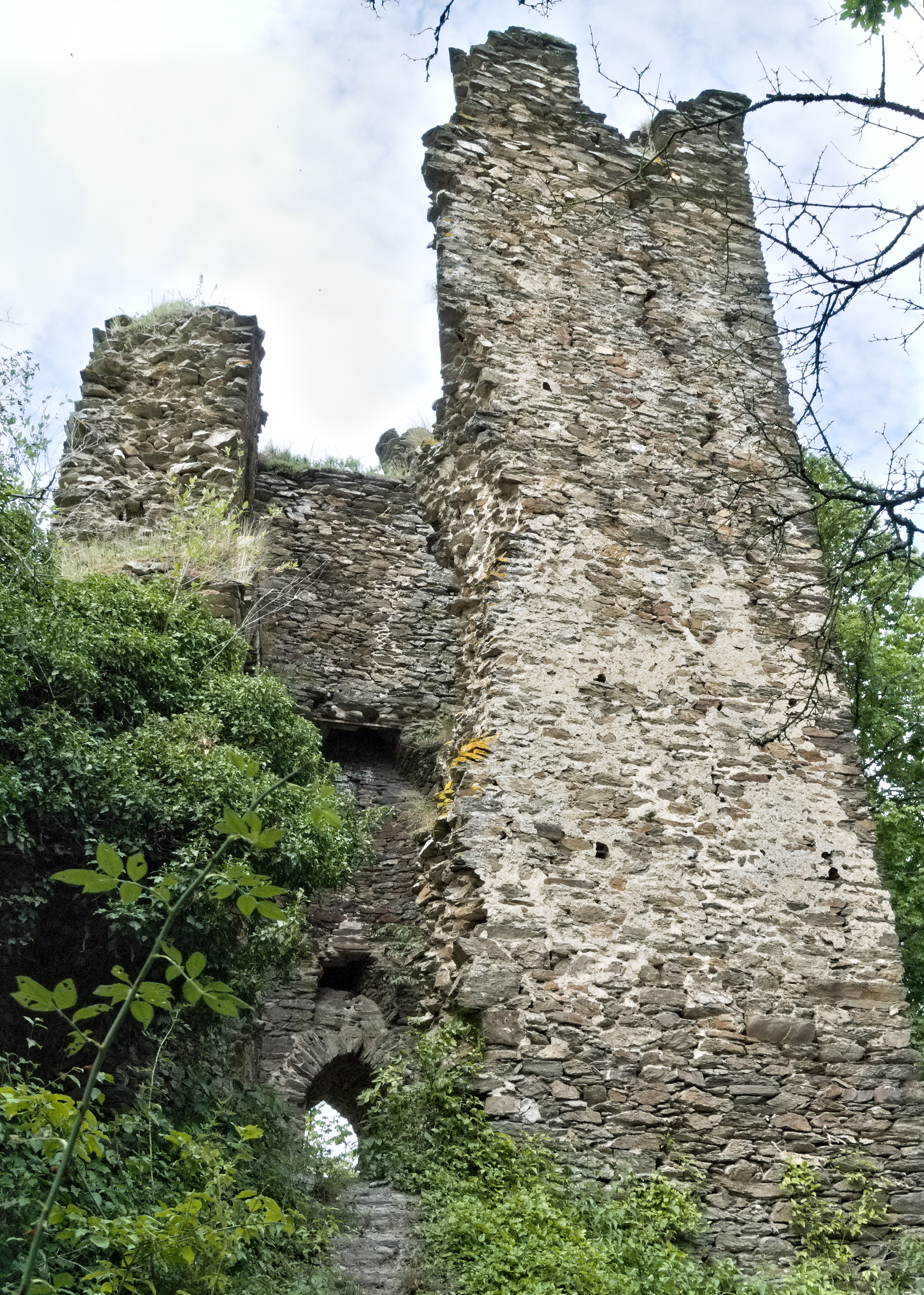
Rheinberg castle keep ruins, near Lorch

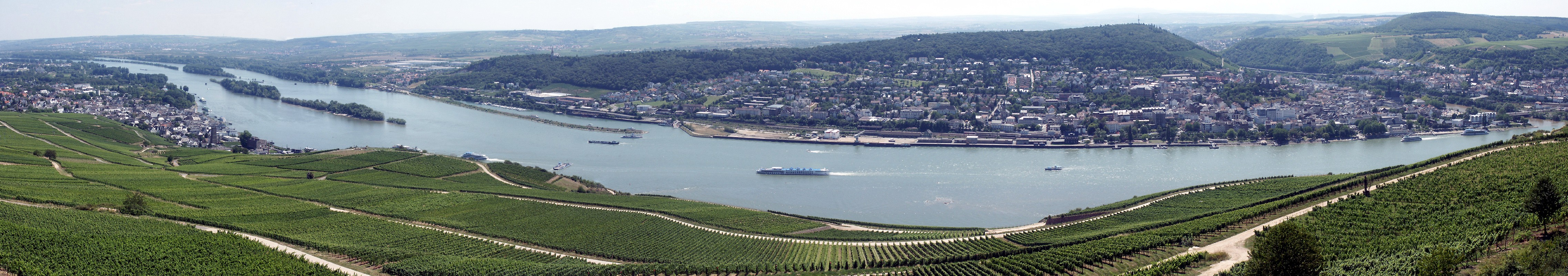
View from the Niederwald-Monument into the Rheingau

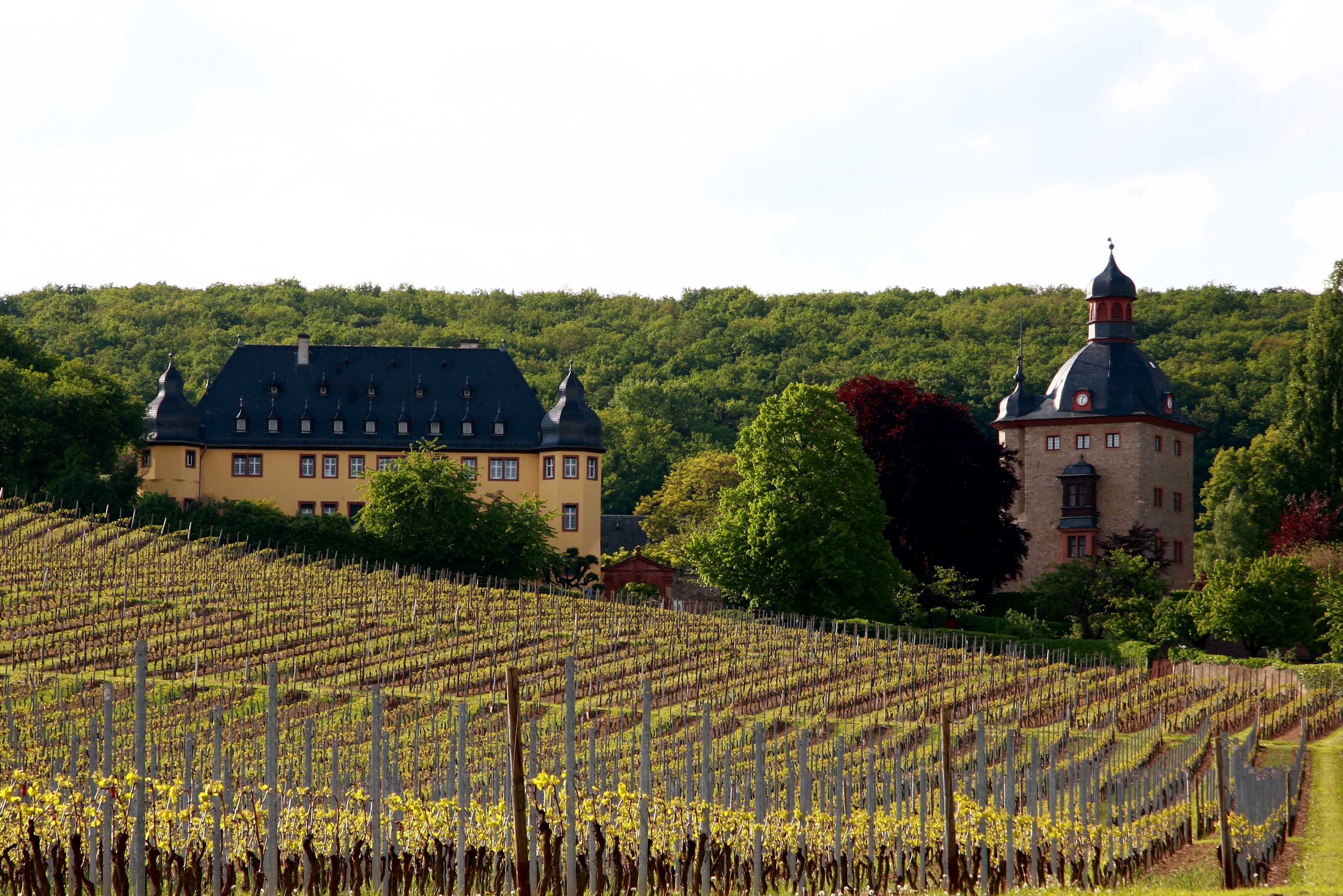
Schloss Vollrads near Oestrich-Winkel

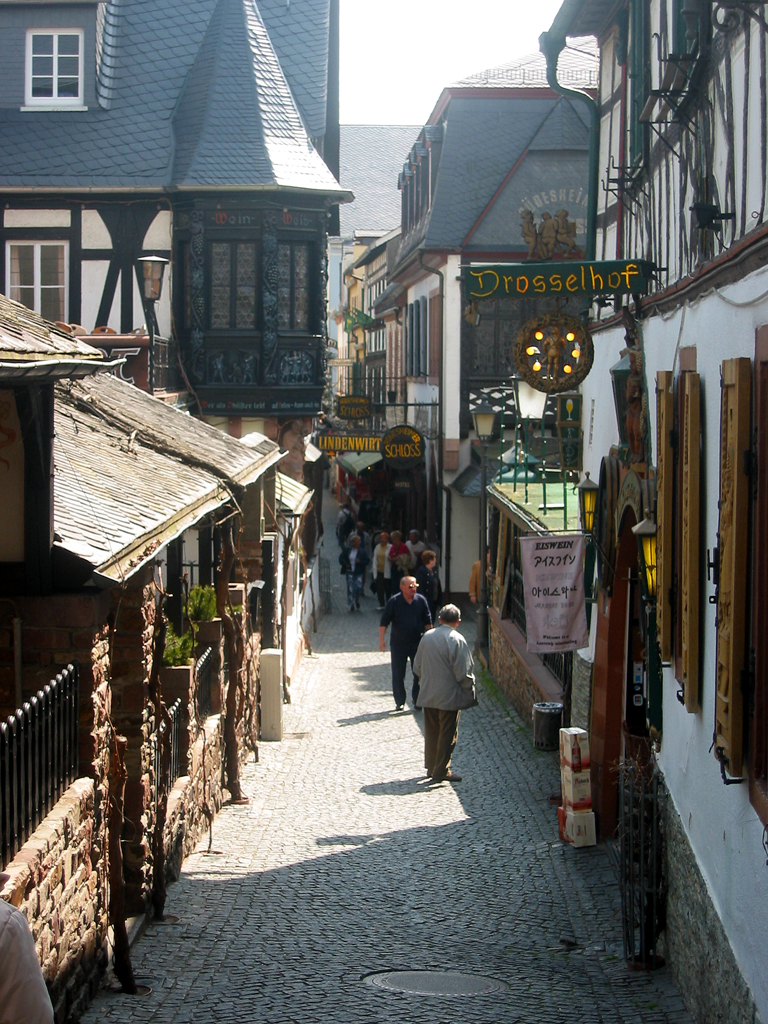
The Drosselgasse in Rüdesheim

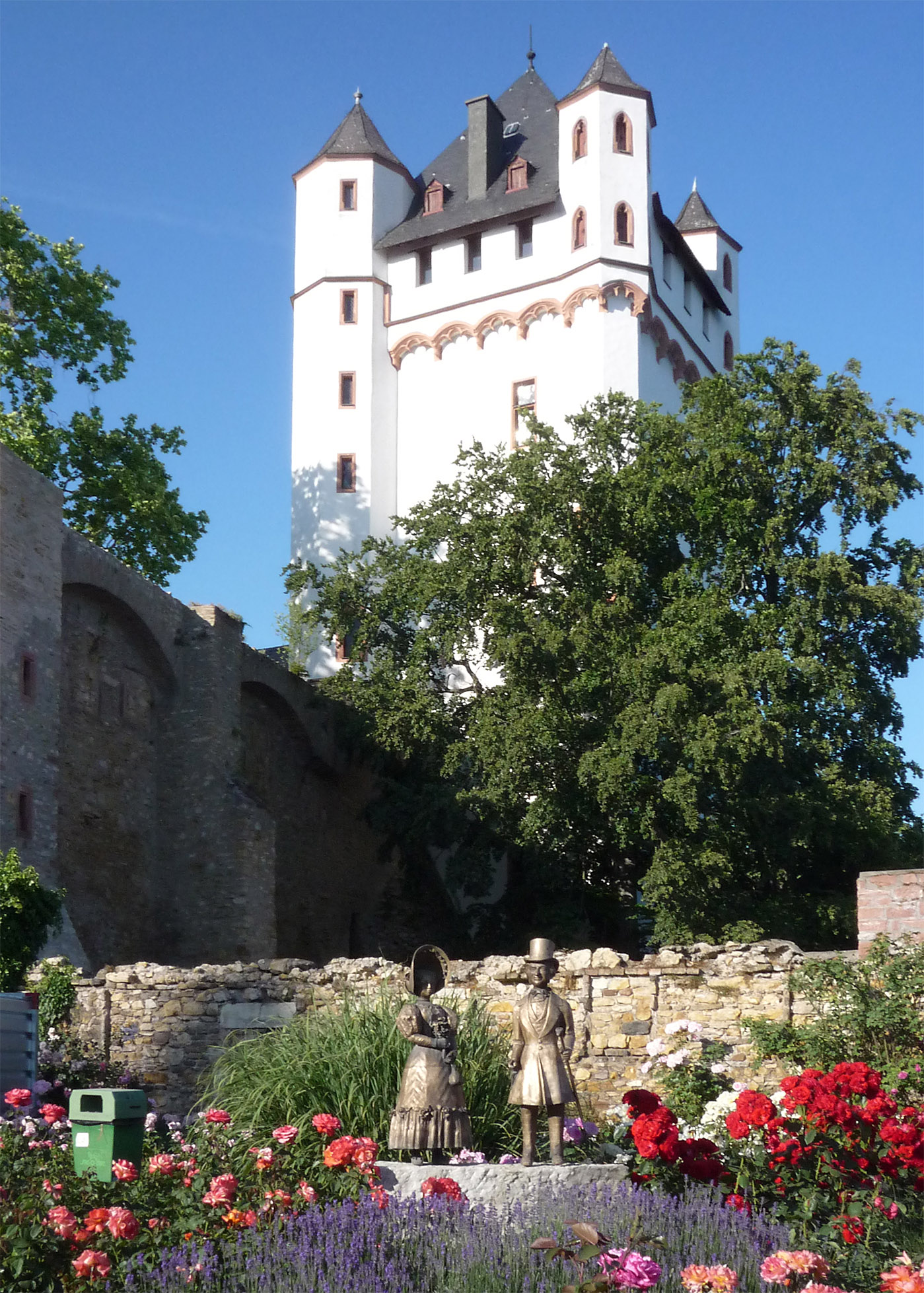
Eltville Castle

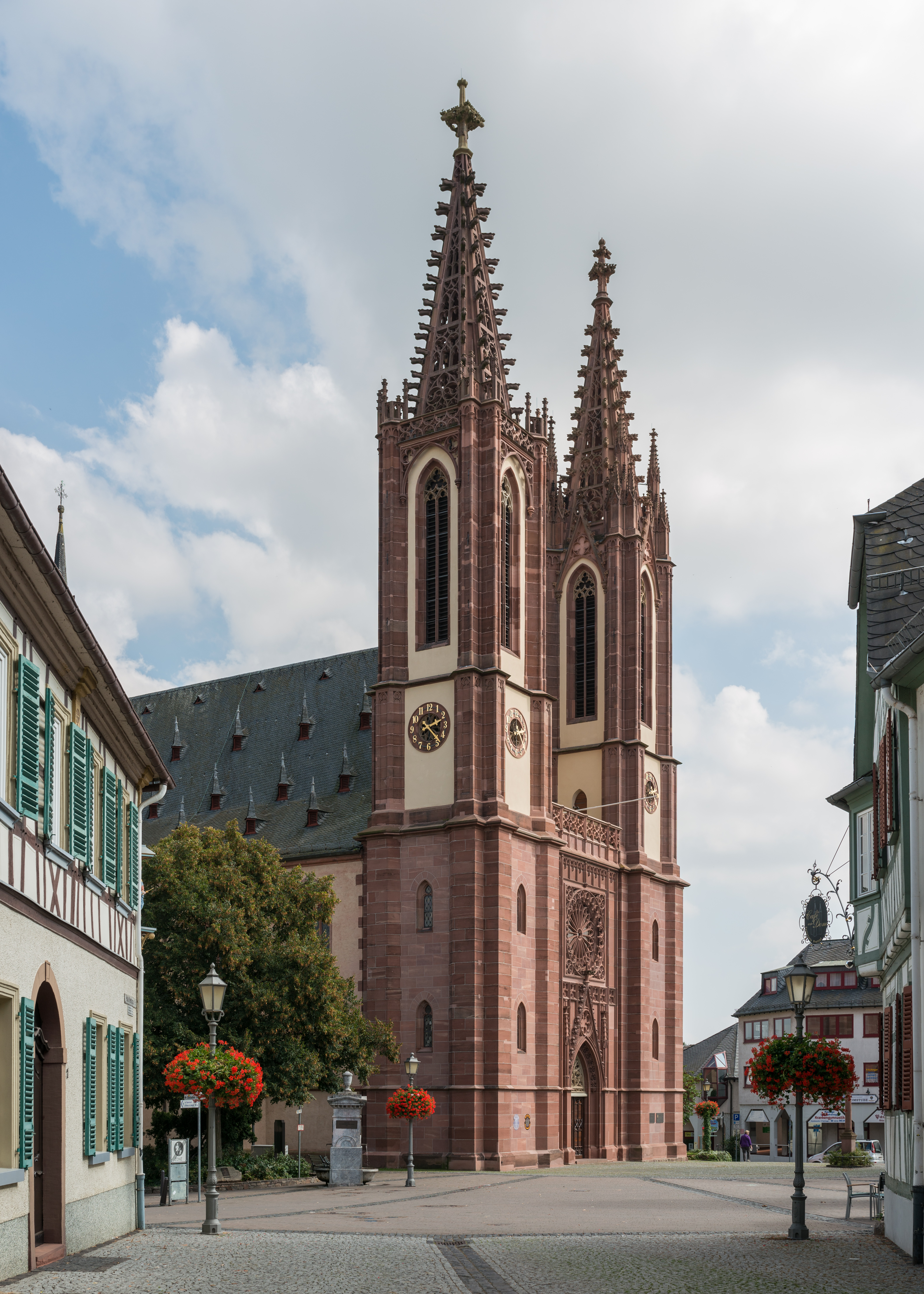
The Rheingauer Dom in Geisenheim

== Events ==
- The Rheingau Musik Festival takes place every year in July and August in many locations throughout the region.
- The Rheingau Wine Festival takes place in Wiesbaden every year in August.
- Most towns celebrate their own annual wine festival.
