= Eltville Castle =

Castle in Eltville am Rhein, Germany

Burg Eltville Eltville Castle
- Kurfürstliche Burg
- Eltville am Rhein
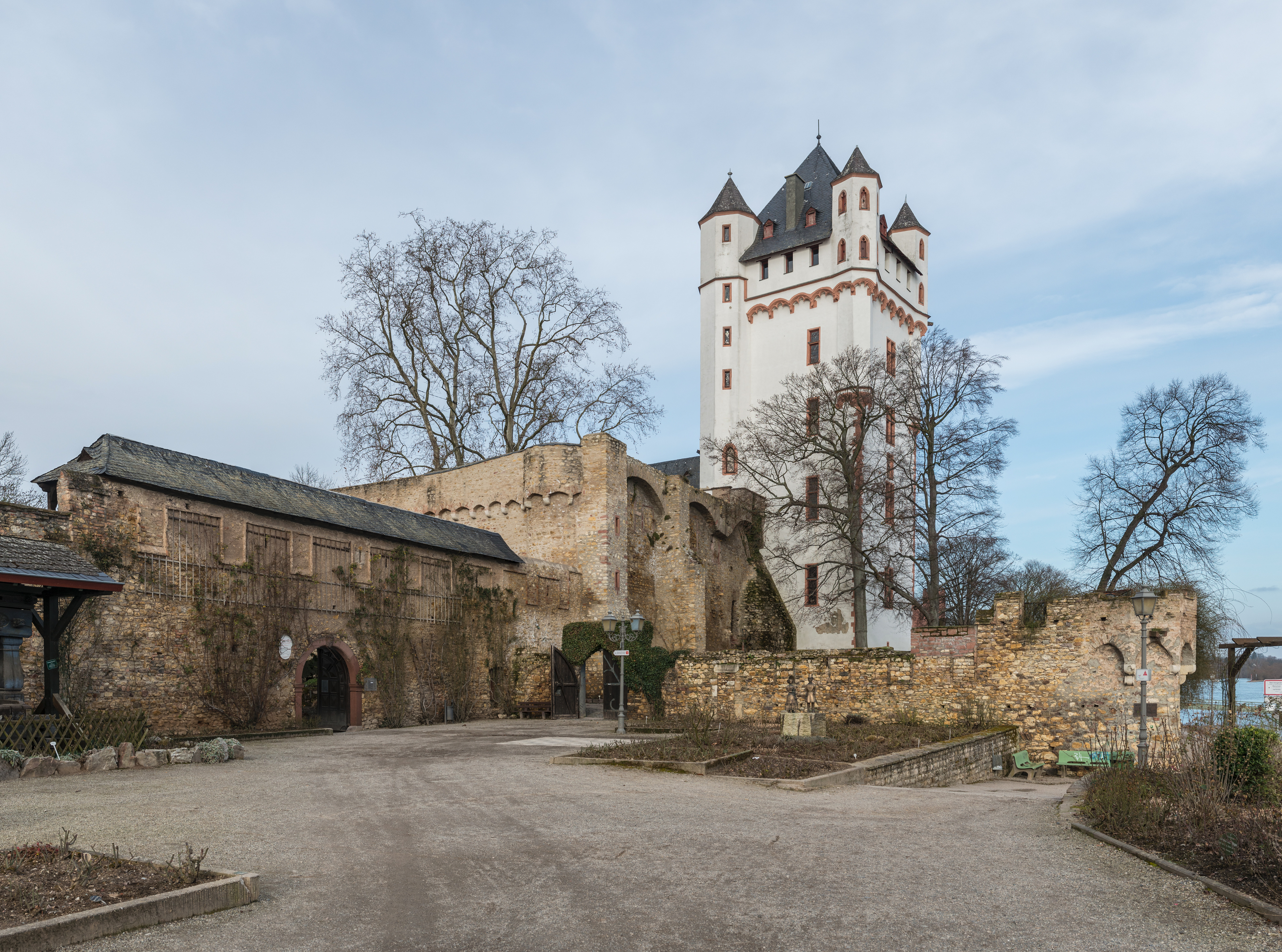

Site information
- Type: urban
- Code: DE-HE
- Condition: largely preserved

Location
- Coordinates: 50°1′29.5″N 8°7′22″E
- Height: 95 m above sea level (NN)

Site history
- Built: before 1300

Garrison information
- Occupants: nobility

Eltville Castle (Burg Eltville) is an urban castle in Eltville am Rhein in the Hessian county of Rheingau-Taunus and is the symbol of the town. In German the castle is also known as the Kurfürstliche Burg (Elector's Castle).

== History ==
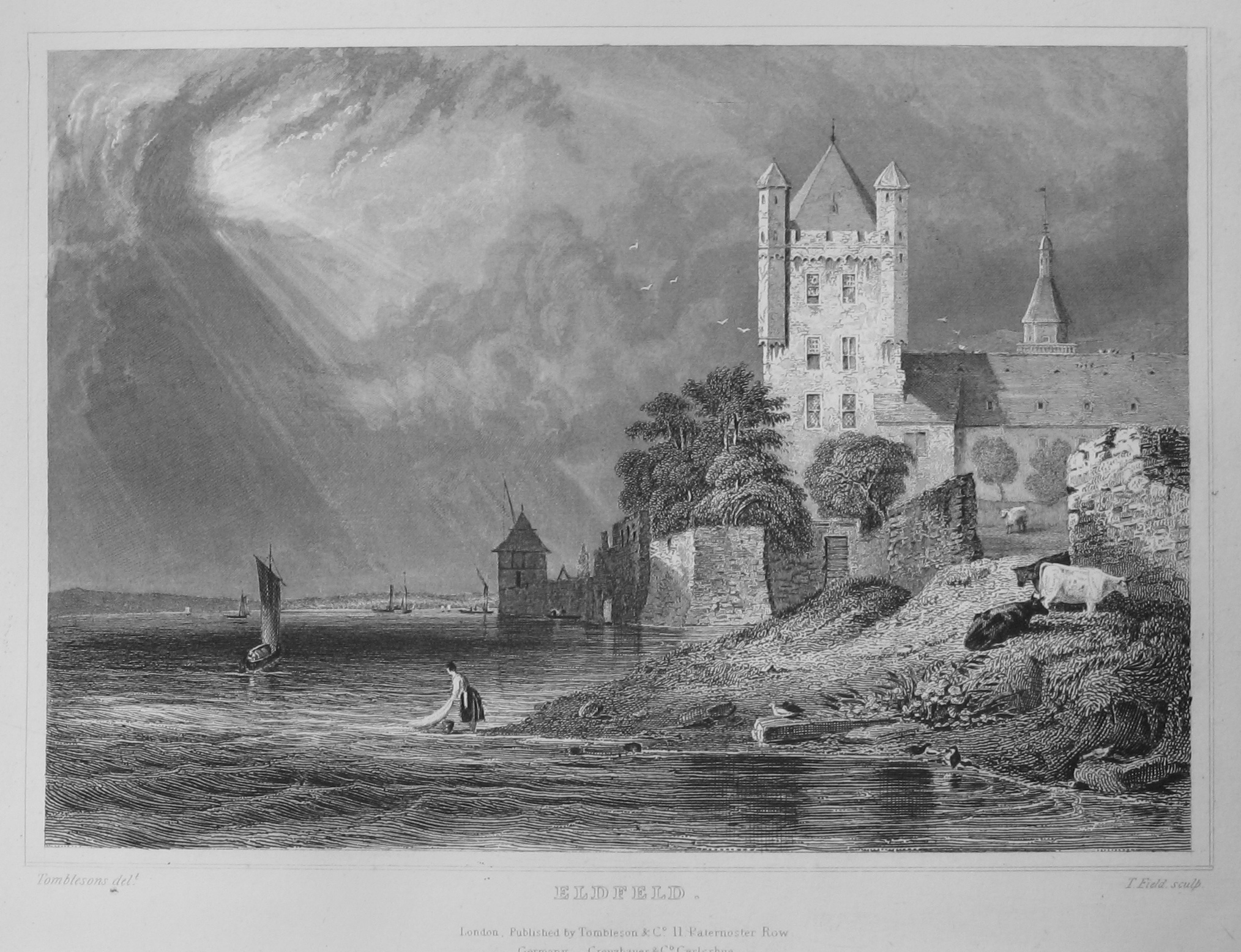
Eltville Castle around 1832 in an engraving by Tombleson

In 1301 an older tower castle on the same spot was destroyed in the "Toll War" (Zollkrieg). After the election of the Archbishop of Trier, Baldwin of Luxembourg, as Archbishop of Mainz in 1328 by the cathedral chapter of Mainz, and the simultaneous appointment of Henry of Virneburg to the same office by the Pope, Eltville became a bishop's residence since there were two contenders for the same archepiscopal seat. Construction of the castle under Archbishop Baldwin began in 1330 and was completed in 1345. Further building work was carried out until 1419; this included internal modifications to the tower house.

The castle was destroyed by the Swedes in 1635 during the Thirty Years' War. Only the tower house remained, which was partially rebuilt in 1682.

In 1938 the surviving castle structures were restored. Further preservation measures were carried out in the 1980s. The most recent restoration began in 2008 and is expected to continue for several years.

== Layout ==
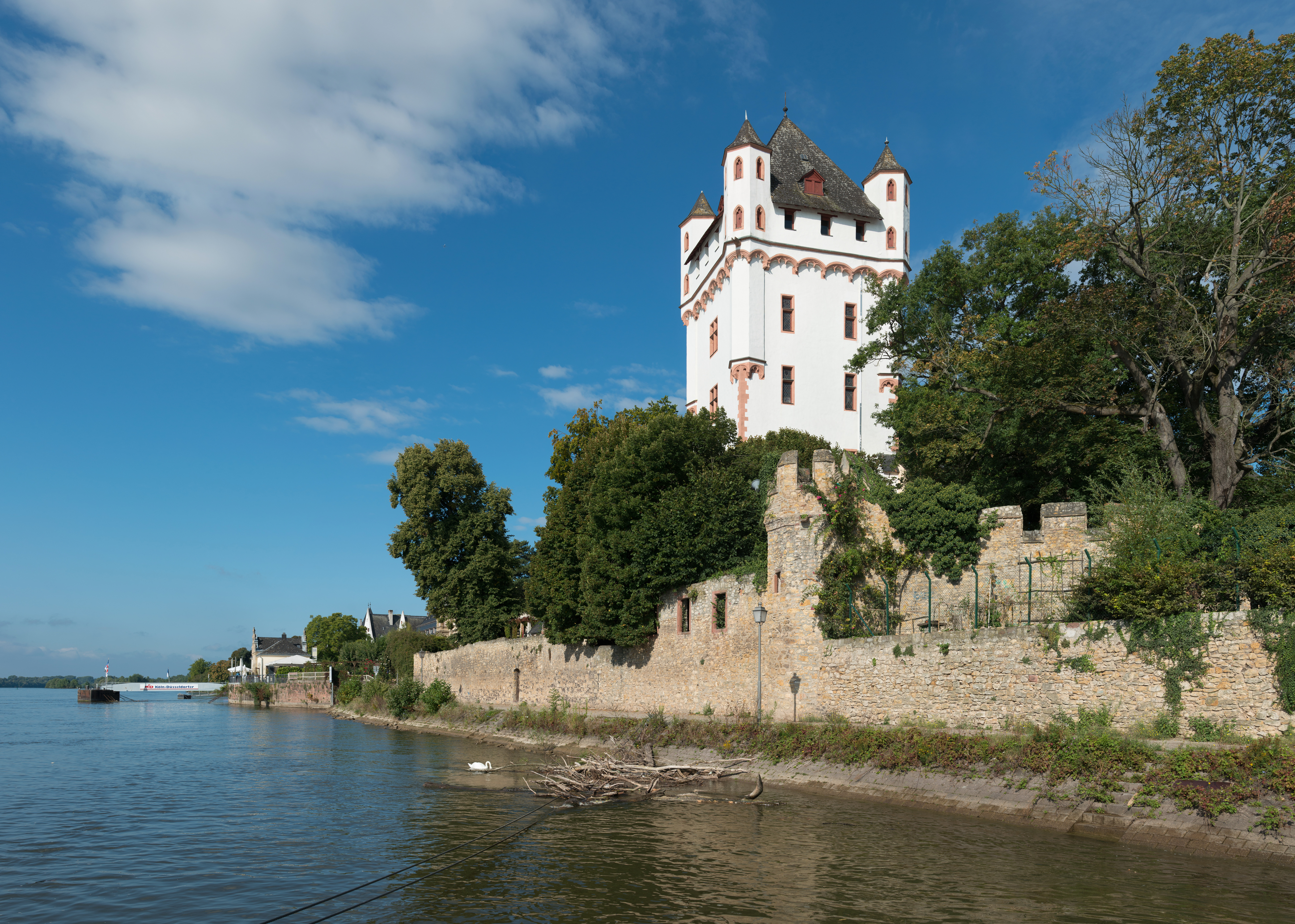
Location of the castle on the Rhine

The castle is accessed via a wall walk and a moat bridge that leads to the north gate. To the left of the gate is the east wing with the castle hall (Burgsaal) and electoral hall (Kurfürstensaal). On its south side is the 24- metre-high fortified tower house with attached staircase tower, through which the various levels are accessible. A 40-step spiral staircase leads down to the dungeon. The ground floor used to serve as a lounge for the castle servants. On the first floor of the tower is the count's chamber (Grafenkammer), the most elegant room in the castle at the time. With its richly decorated walls and huge fireplace, it was used as a working and living room.

To the west of the castle tower is the palas, a former three-story residential building of which only parts of the outer walls remain today. Adjacent to this to the west is a wall walk to the south gate, which leads to the moat, and to the west of this is the district garden. Facing the Rhine, the southernmost part of the castle is the lower zwinger, which is accessible through a gate that was recently built into the west side of its wall.

The castle is now protected as a heritage site and, because of its special significance, is classified as "cultural monument of national importance".

== Use today ==
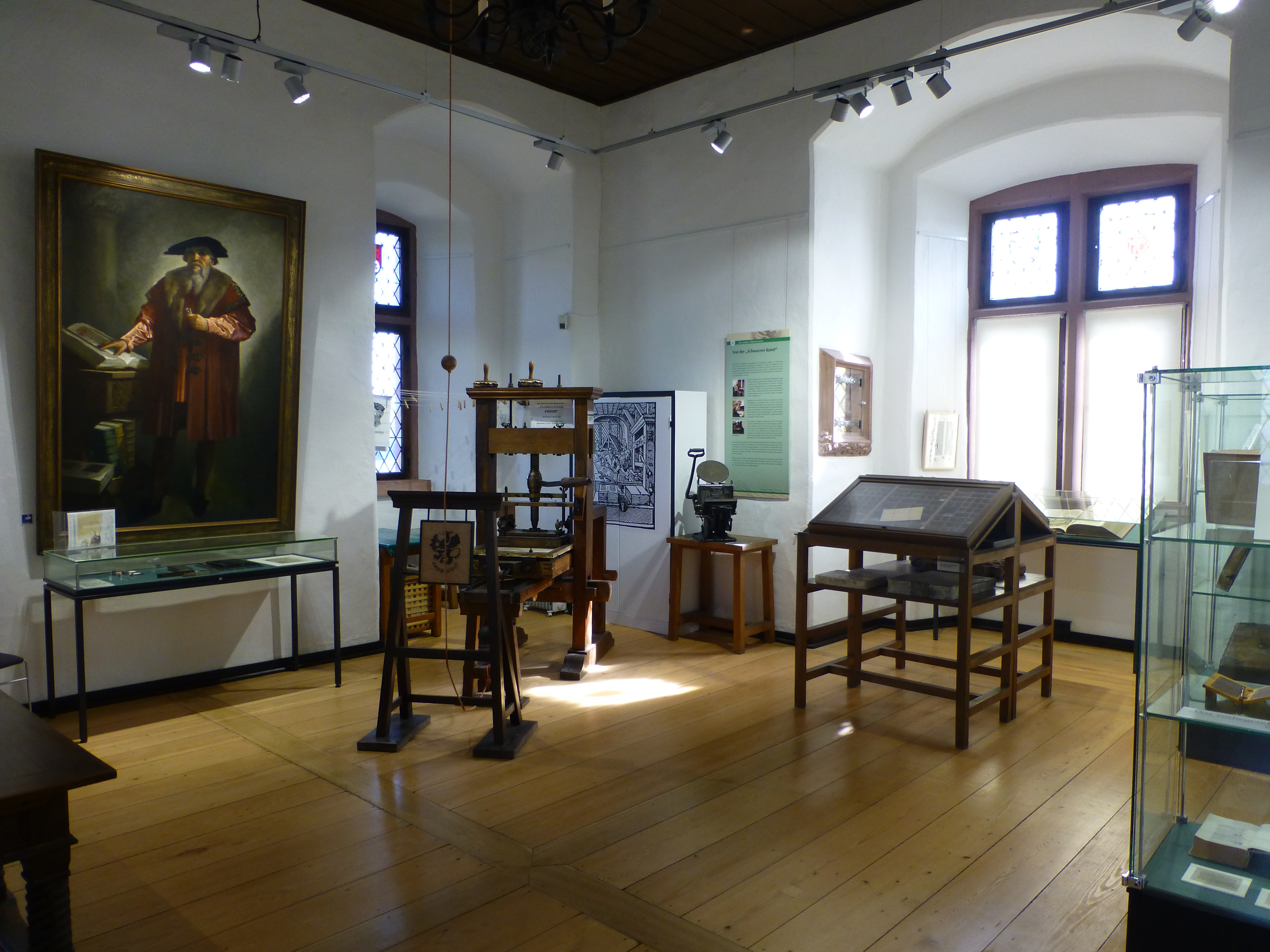
The Gutenberg Memorial

The former prince-electoral castle now houses the Eltville Tourist Information Office and a castle shop on the ground floor of the castle tower. On the upper floors of the tower is a museum that includes a Gutenberg memorial with a historical collection about the art of printing. On the third floor, the cathedral chamber, the alta villa collection presents documents on Eltville's town history and important engravings of Eltville. The defensive platform (Wehrplatte) on the fourth floor, which can be reached via 118 steps, now serves as a viewing platform with views of the Rhine Valley, the town of Eltville and vineyards at the foothills of the Taunus.

The castle also offers a "gallery in the tower" for art exhibitions and is the venue for many cultural events, such as the Eltville Burghofspiele until 2007. Furthermore, the headquarters of the local registry office is located in the east wing.
