= Clos (vineyard) =

Walled vineyard

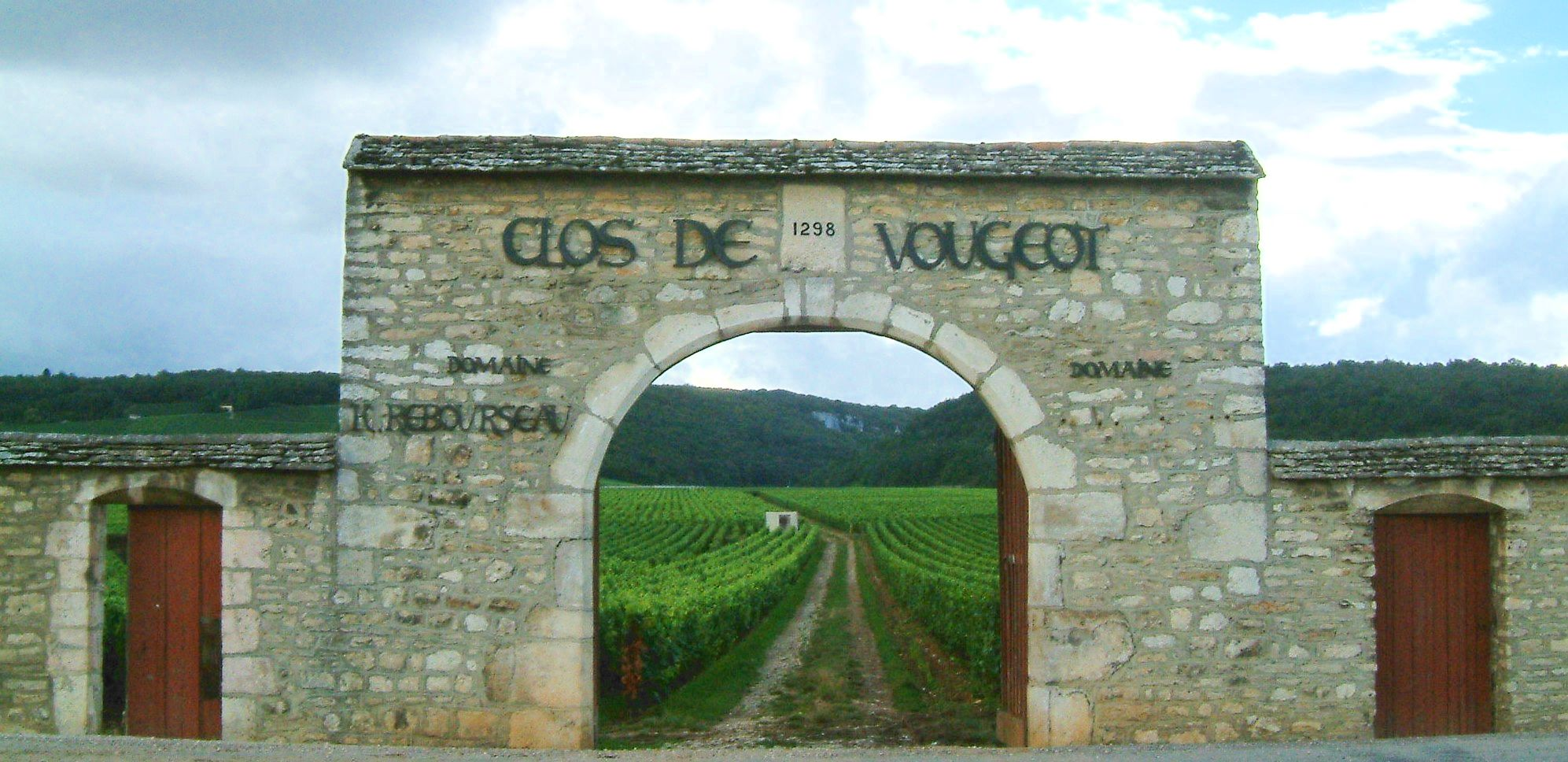
Clos de Vougeot

A clos (French 'enclosure') is a walled vineyard. Walled vineyards protected the grapes from theft and may improve the mesoclimate. They were often the vineyards of Cistercian monasteries. The word is often used in the name of famous wines even when the wall no longer exists.

== By country ==
=== France ===
- Bordeaux: Château Léoville-Las Cases, Clos Haut-Peyraguey, Clos Fourtet, Clos des Jacobins, Clos de l'Oratoire, Clos de Plince, Clos Saint-Martin

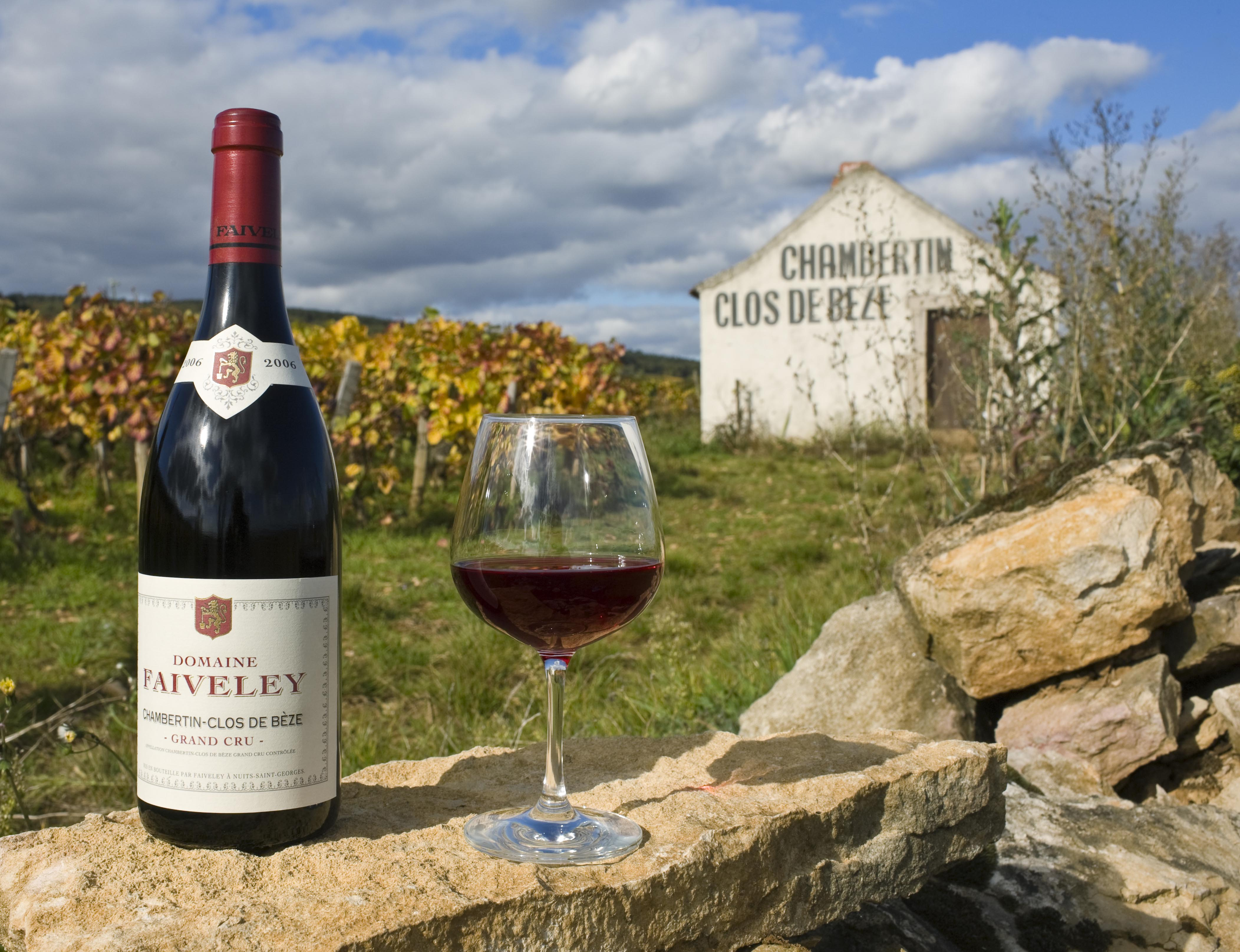
Chambertin Clos de Bèze

- Burgundy: Clos Napoléon (Fixin), Chambertin-Clos de Bèze, Clos de Tart, Clos des Lambrays, Clos de la Roche, Clos Saint-Denis, La Romanée together with La Romanée-Conti, Clos de Vougeot, Clos des Réas (Vougeot), Corton-Clos du Roi, Clos des Ursules, Clos des Mouches (Beaune), Clos des Épeneaux (Pommard), Clos du Val (Auxey-Duresses), Clos des Chênes (Volnay), Montrachet
- Champagne: officially recognised as clos:
  - Clos des Goisses (Mareuil-sur-Aÿ; see Champagne Philipponnat),
  - Clos du Mesnil (Le Mesnil-sur-Oger; see Champagne Krug),

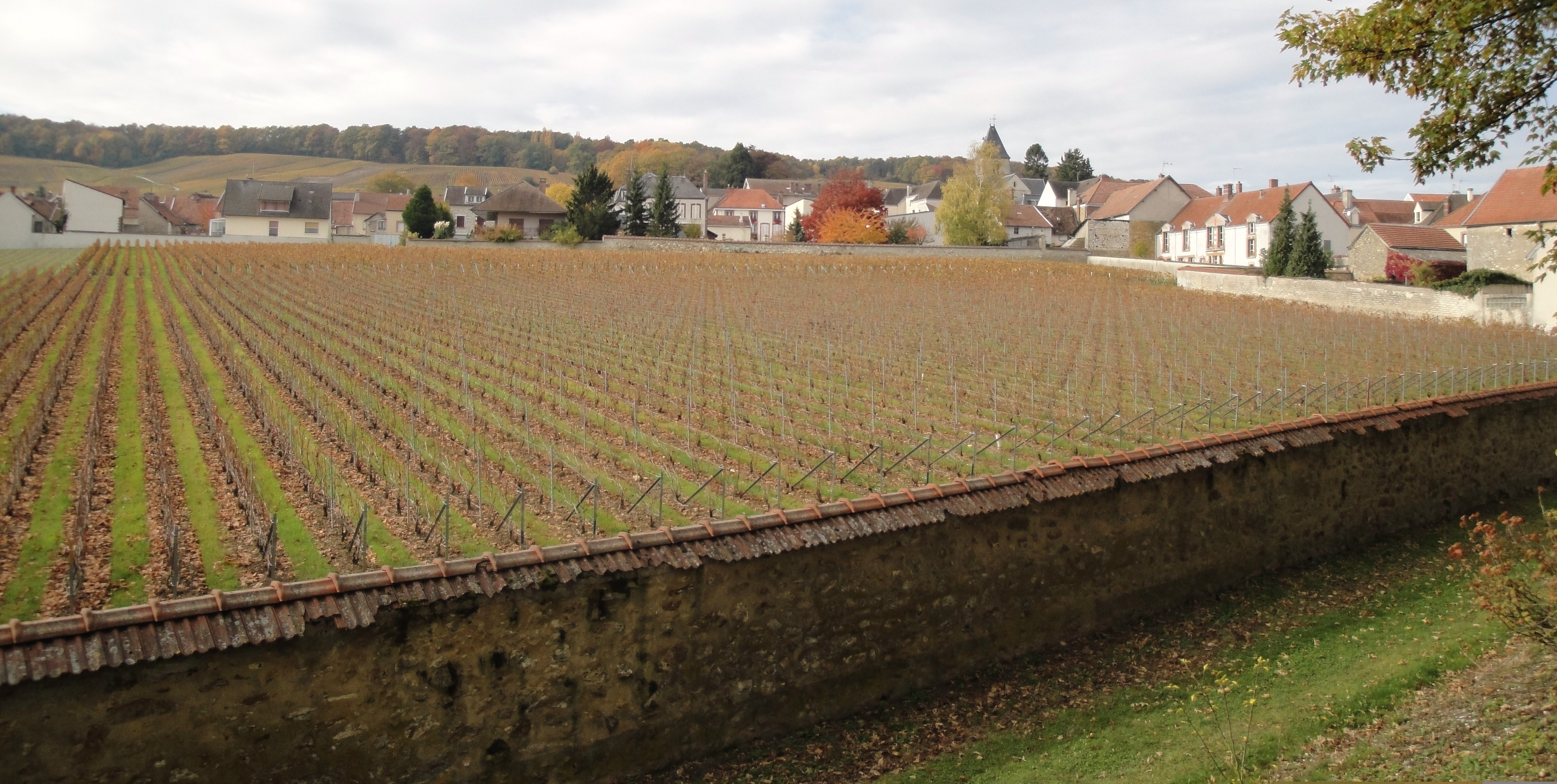
Clos du Mesnil

  - Clos Saint Hilaire (Mareuil-sur-Aÿ; see Billecart-Salmon),
  - Clos d’Ambonnay (Ambonnay; see Champagne Krug),
  - Clos du Moulin (Chigny les Roses; see Cattier),
  - Clos Cazals (Oger; of Champagne Claude Cazals),
  - Clos des Faubourgs de Notre Dame (Vertus; of Champagne Veuve Fourny),
  - (Clos) Vieilles Vignes Françaises (from Clos Saint Jacques (Aÿ) plus the parcelles Chaudes-Terres (Aÿ) and Croix Rouge (Bouzy); see Champagne Bollinger),
  - Clos Virgile (Beaumont-sur-Vesle; of Champagne Paul Sadi (Portier)),
  - Clos des Chaulins (Pargny-les-Reims; of Champagne Médot),
  - Le Petit Clos (Bouzy; of Champagne Jean Veselle),
  - Clos l’Abbé (Cramant; of Champagne Hubert Soreau),
  - Clos des Belvals (Vertus; of Champagne Person),
  - Clos des Bouveries (Vertus; see Duval-Leroy),
  - Clos Lanson (Reims; see Champagne Lanson),
  - Le Clos (Pierry; of Champagne Henri Mandois),
  - Clos des Bergeronneau (Ville-Dommange; of Champagne Florent Bergeronneau-Marion),
  - Clos de l’Abbaye (Vertus; of Champagne Doyard),
  - Clos Pompadour (Reims; see Pommery), Le Clos (Bouzy; of Champagne André Clouet),
  - Clos Jarot (Vandières; of Champagne Nowack),
  - Clos Bourmault (Avize; of Champagne Christian Bourmault),
  - Clos du Château de Bligny (Bligny; of Champagne Chateau de Bligny),
  - Clos Rocher (Balnot-sur-Laignes; of Champagne Jean-Michel Grémillet),
  - Clos Sainte-Sophie (Montgueux; of Champagne Jacques Lassaigne),
  - Clos à Doré (Ludes; of Champagne Doré Monmarthe),
  - Clos Barnaut (Bouzy; of Champagne Edmond Barnaut),
  - Clos de Marzilly (Hermonville; of Champagne Olivier Fagot at Rilly-la-Montagne),
  - Clos des Monnaies (Damery; of Champagne Goutorbe-Bouillot),
  - Clos de Cumières (Épernay; of Champagne Jestin),
  - Le Clos d’Hortense (Aÿ; of Champagne Pierre Leboeuf),
  - Clos des Maladries (Avize; of Champagne Etienne Calsac),
  - Clos des Trois Clochers (Villers-Allerand); of Champagne Leclerc Briant),
  - Clos du Montdorin (Charly-sur-Marne; of Champagne Léguillette-Romelot),
  - Clos 667 (Épernay; of Champagne Boivin), as officially recognised as clos.
- Champagne: Also officially recognised are the following lieu-dits ‘clos’:
  - Clos des Graviers (Le Breuil; of Champagne Pierre Mignon),
  - Clos Jacquin (Avize; of Champagne Pierre Callot),
  - Clos Colin (Bouzy; of Champagne Veuve Cliquot),
  - Clos Saint Jean (Moussy; of Champagne José Michel),
  - Clos des Fourches (Tauxières-Mutry; of Champagne Lejeune-Dirvang),
  - Clos des Plants de Chêne (Moussy; of Champagne José Michel) is not currently producing clos-cuvées,
  - Clos Jacquesson (Dizy; see Champagne Jacquesson) is not currently producing clos-cuvées (all according to the Comité Champagne)
- Alsace: Clos Sainte-Hune in Grand Cru Rosacker (Hunawihr), Clos Sainte-Odile (Obernai), Clos Saint-Urbain (Turkheim)
- Loire: Clos de la Coulée-de-Serrant, Clos du Papillon (Savennières), Le Grand Clos (Bourgueil)
- Rhône: Clos des Papes, Clos du Mont-Olivet, Clos de l'Oratoire des Papes (Châteauneuf-du-Pape)
- South West France: Clos La Coutale, Clos de Gamot, Clos Lapeyre, Clos Triguedina (Cahors)

=== Switzerland ===
- Vaud: Clos des Abbayes, Clos des Moines (Dézaley), Clos du Paradis (Aigle), Clos du Rocher, Clos des Rennauds (Yvorne)
- Valais: Clos Grand Brûlé, Clos des Montibeux (Leytron), Clos de Balavaud (Vétroz)

=== Germany ===
- Rheingau: Hattenheimer Pfaffenberg and Steinberg (Eberbach Abbey), Neroberg (Wiesbaden)
- Rheinhessen: Schlossmühle in Heidesheim, Niersteiner Glöck
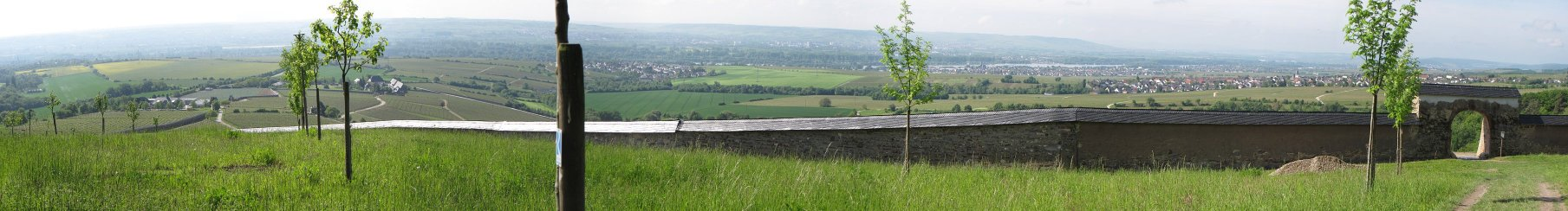
Exterior view of Steinberg, Kloster Eberbach walled vineyard

=== Portugal ===
- Pico, Azores: Nearly all of the vineyards on the island of Pico are enclosed by stone walls, both for protection and as a way to re-use the large number of volcanic rocks that had to be shifted off the soil when vines were first planted.

=== United States ===
- Napa Valley: Clos Du Val, Clos Pegase

=== South Africa ===
- Stellenbosch: Clos Malverne

=== México ===
- Valle de Guadalupe: Clos de Tres Cantos

=== New Zealand ===
The entrance and limestone walls of Clos Ostler in New Zealand's Waitaki Valley.

- Waitaki Valley: Clos Ostler, a vineyard enclosed by a limestone wall.
