= Louise Pommery =

French businesswoman (1819–1890)

Jeanne Alexandrine Louise Pommery
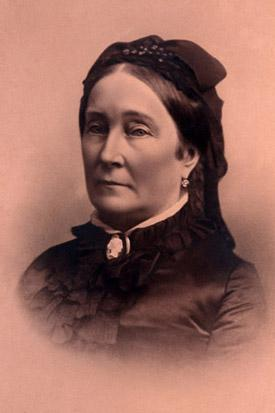
- Born: Jeanne Alexandrine Louise Mélin; April 13, 1819; Annelles (Ardennes)
- Died: March 18, 1890 (aged 70); Chigny-les-Roses
- Occupation: Businesswoman
- Spouse: Alexandre Pommery (married 1839–1860)

Jeanne Alexandrine Louise Pommery (April 13, 1819 – March 18, 1890), was a French Champagne producer. She took on her husband's wine business, Pommery, after she was widowed in 1860.

== Biography ==
Jeanne Alexandrine Louise Mélin was born April 13, 1819, in Annelles (Ardennes). She married Alexandre Pommery in 1839.

Upon Alexandre's death in 1860, she assumed full control of the Pommery business. One of her first decisions was to sell off the wool business, which was struggling, and concentrate on the Champagne wine business.

She purchased 120 limestone and chalk pits, so-called crayères, carved underneath 12 miles (19 km) of the city of Reims by Roman soldiers during their occupation of Gaul. Louise commissioned sculptor Gustave Navlet to carve 4 metres (13 ft) long bas-relief of Bacchus celebrating wine into the walls, and busts by Leon Joseph Chavaillaud. These unique cellars allowed her to store and age thousands of bottles in a temperature-controlled environment (a constant 10 °C). Many other Champagne houses later followed suit. Offices and other buildings above the cellars were modeled after the great English country houses.

In ode to her most loyal clients, the British, Madame Pommery built a Tudor Elizabethan domain in Reims. She would later change the face of Champagne for her English customers, by making the first ever 'brut' Champagne, with no added sugar. She was one of the first company directors in France to create retirement and health funds for her employees.

== Death and legacy ==
Jeanne Alexandrine Louise Pommery died on March 18, 1890, in Chigny-les-Roses, near Reims. She was the first woman to receive a French state funeral. 20,000 people gathered in the streets of Reims to honour her great contributions to the city and the Champagne industry. A tribute was given by the French President, who issued a decree changing the name of Chigny, her country home, to Chigny-les-Roses, in ode to her love of roses.
