= Armand de Brignac =

Champagne brand

- Product type: Champagne
- Current owner: Jay-Z (50%); LVMH (50%)
- Produced by: Cattier
- Country: France
- Introduced: 2006
- Website: Official website
- Headquarters: 11 Rue Domaine Pérignon, 51500 Chigny-les-Roses, France

Armand de Brignac, colloquially known as Ace of Spades, is a French champagne brand owned by American rapper Jay-Z and French luxury goods conglomerate LVMH. The champagne is produced by Cattier and sold in opaque metallic bottles. Its first release, the Armand de Brignac Brut Gold, is distinguished by a gold bottle and French pewter Ace of Spades label.

Armand de Brignac champagnes are produced in a multi-vintage style. The Brut Gold cuvée is a blend of Pinot Noir, Pinot Meunier, and Chardonnay. In 2008, two additional cuvées were introduced: a Rosé and a Blanc de blancs (100% chardonnay).

In 2015, the brand expanded with the introduction of a Demi-sec and a Blanc de noirs (100% Pinot Noir).

== History ==
The Cattier family started setting aside portions of reserve wines for a new ultra-premium Champagne project at the beginning of the twenty-first century. The first bottles of Armand de Brignac Brut Gold left the cellars in France in 2006.

The original "de Brignac" name was registered by the Cattier family in "the late 1940s or early 50s", according to Jean-Jacques Cattier. It was chosen at that time by his mother, who had been reading a novel featuring a character named de Brignac. Dormant for decades, the brand was revived for the new champagne after adding the name Armand. This was required by the French industry group Comité Interprofessionnel du vin de Champagne (CIVC) to avoid any confusion with the northwestern French village of Brignac, sitting just outside of the Champagne region itself. In November 2014 it was announced that the champagne brand had been bought by a company led by Jay-Z.

== Champagnes ==
All champagnes in the portfolio are an assemblage of three vintages. There are five cuvées in the Armand de Brignac range:

Armand de Brignac Brut Gold is the flagship tête de cuvée from the 13th generation Montagne de Reims champagne growers, the Cattier family, the first bottles were released in 2006. The assemblage typically comprises 40% Pinot Noir, 40% Chardonnay, and 20% Pinot Meunier.

Armand de Brignac Rosé was first introduced in 2008. The color comes from the inclusion of 12% of still red wine, harvested from old vines that produce fruit with great flavor intensity. The assemblage typically comprises 50% Pinot Noir, 40% Pinot Meunier, and 10% Chardonnay.

Armand de Brignac Demi Sec was first released at the end of 2015. It is a sweeter style of champagne with just 34 g/L of sugar. The assemblage typically comprises 40% Pinot Noir, 40% Chardonnay, and 20% Pinot Meunier.

Armand de Brignac Blanc de Blancs is a single varietal champagne comprising 100% Chardonnay. Fruit is sourced from traditional Chardonnay territory, the Côte des Blancs, as well from Montagne de Reims. The first bottles were released in 2008.

Armand de Brignac Blanc de Noirs is the rarest cuvée in the Armand de Brignac range, with fewer than 3,000 bottles created for each assemblage. It is a 100% Pinot Noir made with fruit from some of the best Pinot Noir growing villages in the region including Verzenay and Chigy les Roses. The first bottles were for sale exclusively at Harrods in November 2015.

== Winemaking ==
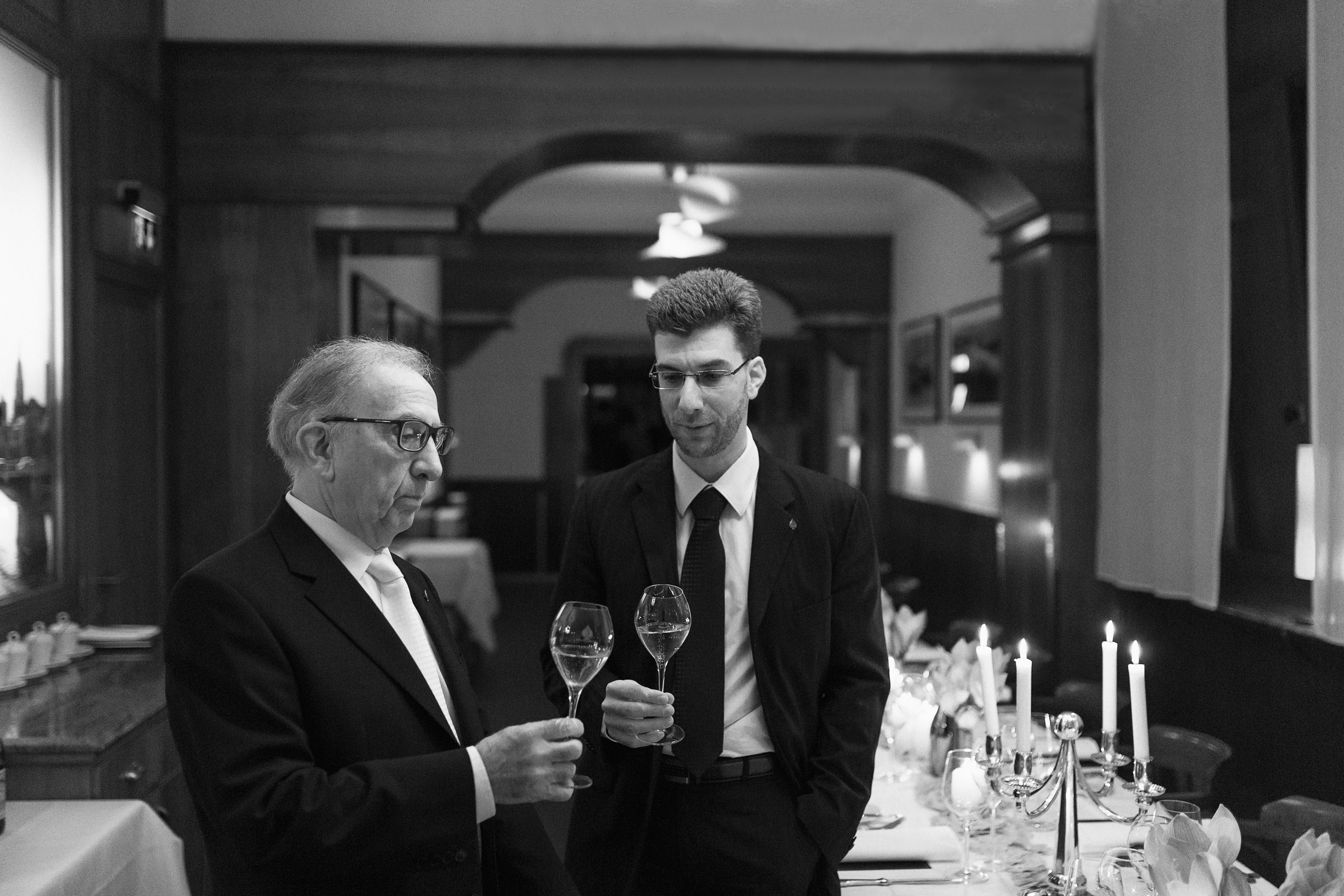
Father and son Armand de Brignac winemakers Jean-Jacques and Alexandre Cattier

The Champagne Cattier team who produce Armand de Brignac is led by Jean-Jacques and Alexandre Cattier, 12th and 13th generation champagne growers. A team of 18 people touch a bottle of Armand de Brignac from pressing the fruit to when the bottles leave the cellars in France.

The Armand de Brignac champagnes are made in the village of Rilly-la-Montagne, in the Montagne de Reims region of Champagne. Fruit is sourced from the 30+ hectares owned by the Cattier family and from growers in selected villages across the region. All three major Champagne grape varieties are used: Chardonnay, Pinot Noir, and Pinot Meunier.

After hand-picking, the fruit is pressed in one of two family-owned wineries located close to the vineyards. The first press of 4,000 kilos of grapes provides an allowable yield of 20.5 hectolitres of juice (the "cuvée") and Armand de Brignac selects just the very first and freshest portion of this press.

The champagnes rest on lees in the cellars for years before disgorgement. Armand de Brignac uses a cuvee that comprises still wines aged for one year in French oak barrels. These oak barrels are placed 30 ft underground and are thought to give the champagne its complexity and life.

Each metalized bottle is finished by hand, with the application of French pewter labels, polished, and housed in a wooden lacquered gift box, ensuring every single bottle is unique. The annual yield for these bottles is roughly 60,000, which is considered fairly low in comparison to other named brands.

== Reception ==
In February 2009, Spanish critic José Peñín published his own review of Armand de Brignac Brut Gold. In November 2009, FINE Champagne magazine published the results of a blind tasting of 1,000 champagne brands, with Armand de Brignac the top finisher.

In 2015, wine critic Jancis Robinson MW rated the new Blanc de Noirs and Demi Sec champagnes 18/20 points. That year, Armand de Brignac Blanc de Blancs received a Double Gold Medal in the San Francisco International Wine Competition. Armand de Brignac Brut Gold was also awarded a Gold Medal at the 2015 San Francisco International Wine Competition.

In 2016, Armand de Brignac Blanc de Noirs Assemblage One (A1) was awarded the #1 Blanc De Noirs in the World for 2016 by FINE Champagne. In the same year, Wine Spectator rated Armand de Brignac Rosé 92 points and the Tasting Panel rated Armand de Brignac Brut Gold 93 points, and the Blanc de Blancs was awarded 94 points. Decanter awarded 96 points to the new release Armand de Brignac Blanc de Noirs Assemblage Two (A2), 95 points for the Brut Gold and both the Rosé and Demi Sec cuvées were given 93 point ratings.

In 2017, Armand de Brignac Brut Rosé was awarded Best Rosé Champagne in the World for 2017 by TastingBook.com.

== In popular culture ==
An appearance in Jay-Z's 2006 music video for "Show Me What You Got" prior to the launch of the Armand de Brignac brand sparked wide discussion on sites covering hip-hop and popular culture, following his public fallout with the makers of Cristal.

In June 2011 Mark Cuban spent $90,000 on a 15-litre bottle (10 magnum bottles) of Armand de Brignac in celebration of the Dallas Mavericks' NBA Championship. A week later, the Boston Bruins purchased a 30-litre bottle of Armand de Brignac, dubbed the "Midas", for $100,000. At the time of the purchase, the Midas bottle was one of six bottles released to date worldwide. It is the largest bottle of Champagne available in the world and is made only by Armand de Brignac.
