= Annelles =

- Commune
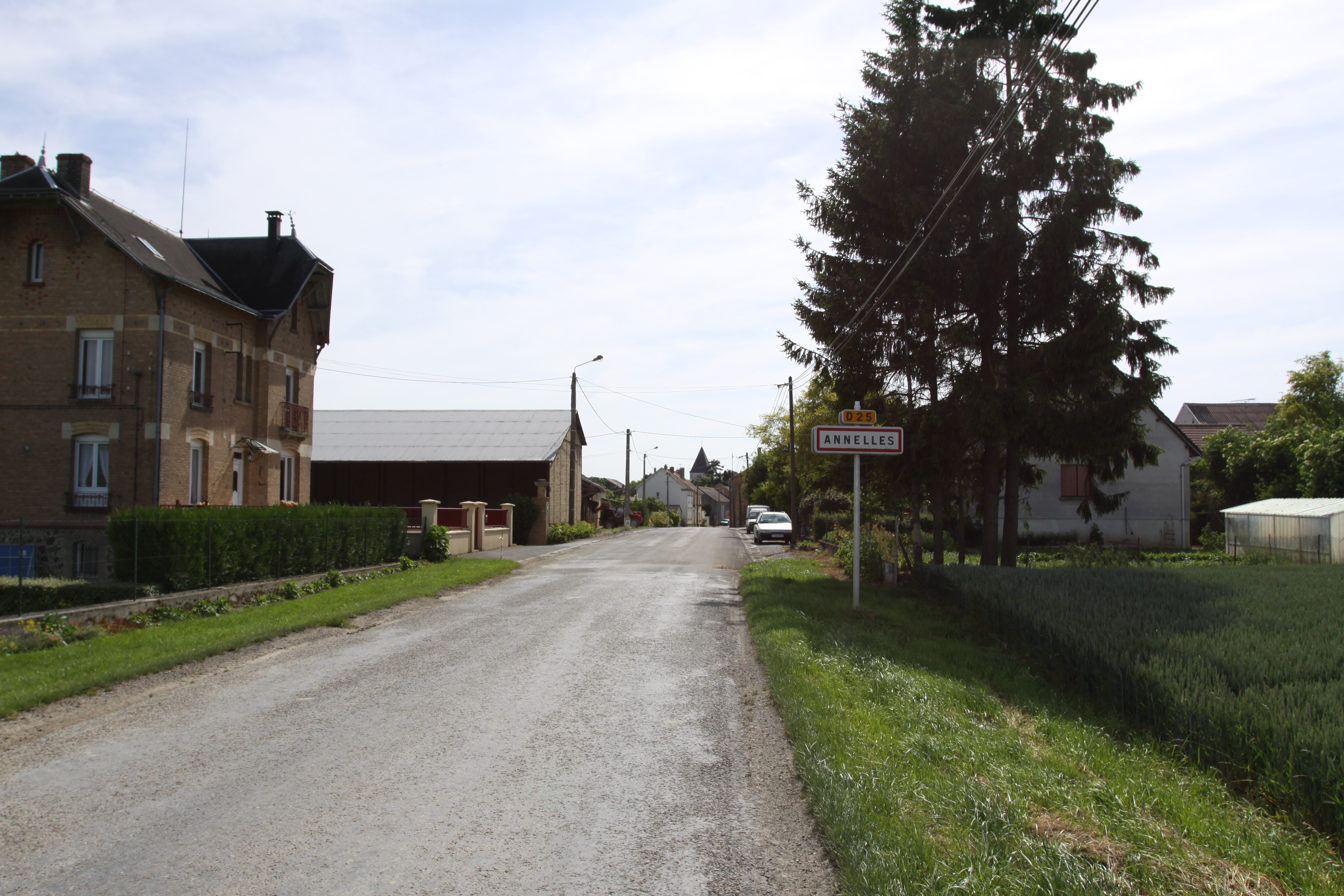
- The Village

- Coat of arms
- Location of Annelles
- Location within France Location within Grand Est
- Coordinates: 49°25′43″N 4°25′12″E
- Country: France
- Region: Grand Est
- Department: Ardennes
- Arrondissement: Rethel
- Canton: Château-Porcien
- Intercommunality: Pays Rethélois

Government
  - Mayor (2020–2026): Anne Cuif
- Area^{1}: 12.31 km^{2} (4.75 sq mi)
- Elevation: 120 m (390 ft)
- Highest elevation: 168 m (551 ft)
- Lowest elevation: 98 m (322 ft)
- Population (2023): 127
  - Density: 10.3/km^{2} (26.7/sq mi)
- Time zone: UTC+01:00 (CET)
  - Summer (DST): UTC+02:00 (CEST)
- INSEE/Postal code: 08014 /08310
- ^{1} French Land Register data, which excludes lakes, ponds, glaciers > 1 km^{2} (0.386 sq mi or 247 acres) and river estuaries.

Annelles (French pronunciation: [anɛl]) is a commune in the Ardennes department in the Grand Est region of northern France.

== Geography ==
Annelles is located some 10 km south-east of Rethel and 4 km north-east of Juniville. It can be accessed by the D25 road from Juniville which passes through the heart of the commune and the village and continues to Saulces-Champenoises in the north-east. Apart from the village the commune is entirely farmland.

=== Heraldry ===
| Arms of Annelles | The official status of the blazon is yet to be determined Blazon: Azure, a double-headed eagle of Or debruised by a crozier of Argent, in chief Gules charged with 3 annulets of Or. |

== Administration ==
List of Successive Mayors

| From | To | Name | Party | Position |
|---|---|---|---|---|
| 1791 | 1807 | Sulpice Tocut | | |
| 1807 | 1816 | Jean-Rémy Coutin | | |
| 1816 | 1821 | François Baudet | | |
| 1821 | 1843 | Jean-Rémy Coutin | | |
| 1843 | 1843 | Jean-Baptiste Desterbay | | |
| 1843 | 1855 | Alexandre-Louis Lescuyer | | General Councillor |
| 1856 | 1871 | Maximillien Tocut | | |
| 1871 | 1874 | Jean-Baptiste Vilain | | |
| 1874 | 1891 | Jules-Armand Carré | | |
| 1891 | 1898 | Jean-Baptiste Fricotteau | | |
| 1898 | | Joseph-Auguste Devaux | | |
| 1995 | 2001 | Dominique Tassot | | |
| 2001 | 2014 | Denis Fricotteau | | |
| 2014 | Current | Anne Cuif | | |

== Population ==
The inhabitants of the commune are known as Annellois or Annelloises in French.

Historical population
| Year | Pop. | ±% p.a. |
|---|---|---|
| 1968 | 95 | — |
| 1975 | 90 | −0.77% |
| 1982 | 89 | −0.16% |
| 1990 | 110 | +2.68% |
| 1999 | 118 | +0.78% |
| 2007 | 130 | +1.22% |
| 2012 | 138 | +1.20% |
| 2017 | 141 | +0.43% |
| 2023 | 127 | −1.73% |
Source: INSEE

== Culture and heritage ==
=== Religious heritage ===
The Church contains 3 Paintings: The Descent from the Cross, Christ and the Samaritan, and the Apparition of Madeleine (18th century) which are registered as historical objects.

=== The oldest families ===
From the 1600s onwards the most prominent families were: Rogelet, Mahaut, Desterbay, Thierard, Vuibert, Hinguerlot, Guillet, Micart, Carrelot, Bonnevie, Perinet, Detez, Coutin, Fricoteau, Tocut, Giot, Forest, Verdelet, Lacour, Misset, Bechard, Mayot, Fequant, Lambert, Guillemin, Prévoteau, Soibinet, Simon, Melin, and Gobron.

== Notable people linked to the commune ==
- Jeanne Alexzandrine Pommery, born at Annelles on 13 April 1819 and died at Chigny-les-Roses (Marne) on 18 March 1890 was the founder of the House of Pommery, makers of Champagne wines.

== See also ==
- Communes of the Ardennes department
