= Show Me What You Got =

Single by Jay-Z

from the album Kingdom Come
- Released: October 30, 2006
- Recorded: 2005
- Genre: East Coast hip hop; jazz rap
- Length: 3:44
- Label: Roc-A-Fella; Def Jam
- Songwriters: Shawn Carter; Justin Smith; James Boxley; Eric Sadler; Michael McEwan; Carlton Ridenhour; Johnny Pate
- Producer: Just Blaze

Jay-Z singles chronology
"Déjà Vu" (2006)	"Show Me What You Got" (2006)	"Lost One" (2006)

Music video
- "Show Me What You Got" on YouTube

"Show Me What You Got" is the lead single by rap artist Jay-Z from his album Kingdom Come.

== Song information ==
It is the first single from his "comeback" album Kingdom Come. It was produced by Just Blaze.

The song samples "Show 'Em Whatcha Got" by Public Enemy. The saxophone loop heard prominently throughout the track is sampled from "Darkest Light" by the Lafayette Afro Rock Band and from Johnny Pate's Shaft in Africa. The voice sample yelling "Show 'em whatcha got" is Flavor Flav's from the aforementioned Public Enemy track. In addition to the samples, live instrumentation was performed on the track by a collective of artists known as 1500 or Nothin'.

The song leaked onto the Internet October 6, 2006, and as a result was released officially by Roc-A-Fella Records. The single was released in the UK on December 4, 2006. The single peaked at number 8 on the Billboard Hot 100 chart.

== Music video ==
The music video (directed by F. Gary Gray), debuted on MTV and BET in late October, 2006. It is a homage to several famous scenes from James Bond films of the past including:

- Scenes of a car race in Monaco – GoldenEye
- Scenes of a boat chase – The World Is Not Enough
- Scene of party in a large cave – You Only Live Twice
- Scene of a high-stakes card game with Jarah Mariano – Casino Royale

The music video features Danica Patrick and Dale Earnhardt Jr. racing a Pagani Zonda Roadster and a Ferrari F430 Spider, respectively, around Monaco, with some of the turns being the same ones used for the Monaco Grand Prix. The video was featured during the Lexus Halftime Show during Monday Night Football on ESPN.

The video also introduced the champagne brand Armand de Brignac ("Ace of Spades"), and signaled a shift in Jay-Z's champagne tastes; Jay-Z had previously featured Cristal in his videos, but had recently started to boycott this brand, switching to Armand de Brignac with this video. The video features Jay-Z being offered a bottle of Cristal, which he sends back, and the waiter returns instead with a distinctive gold bottle in a silver briefcase. On release of the video, the champagne had not yet been introduced to the market, but two days after the release of the video, Cattier (the producer, trading as Armand de Brignac) issued a press release identifying themselves as the brand in question, and subsequently gained popularity.

A second version similar to the official video was made as a Budweiser commercial.

The video's theme of Jay-Z being "James Bond" was later used in an advertisement by Budweiser. In it, Jay-Z competes in a holographic football video game against Hall of Fame coach Don Shula. This commercial is an homage to Never Say Never Again (an unauthorised James Bond film), where Bond went head-to-head against Maximillian Largo in a video game at the Casino Royale. The ad debuted during Super Bowl XLI

== Track listing ==
- UK – CD
1. "Show Me What You Got"
2. "Can't Knock The Hustle" (featuring Beyoncé)
- UK – Vinyl
1. "Show Me What You Got" (edited)
2. "Show Me What You Got" (explicit)
3. "Show Me What You Got" (instrumental)

== Charts ==
Chart (2006)	Peak position
Australia (ARIA)	79
Canada Hot 100 (Billboard)	31
Finland (Suomen virallinen lista)	5
Italy (FIMI)	46
Sweden (Sverigetopplistan)	35
New Zealand (Recorded Music NZ)	38
UK Hip Hop/R&B (Official Charts)	7
UK Singles (Official Charts)	38
US Billboard Hot 100	8
US Hot R&B/Hip-Hop Songs (Billboard)	3
US Hot Rap Songs (Billboard)	4
US Pop 100 (Billboard)	13
US Rhythmic Airplay (Billboard)	15

== Certifications ==
Certifications for "Show Me What You Got"
Region	Certification	Certified units/sales
United States (RIAA)	Gold	500,000^{‡}
^{‡} Sales+streaming figures based on certification alone.
