= Steinberg, Kloster Eberbach =

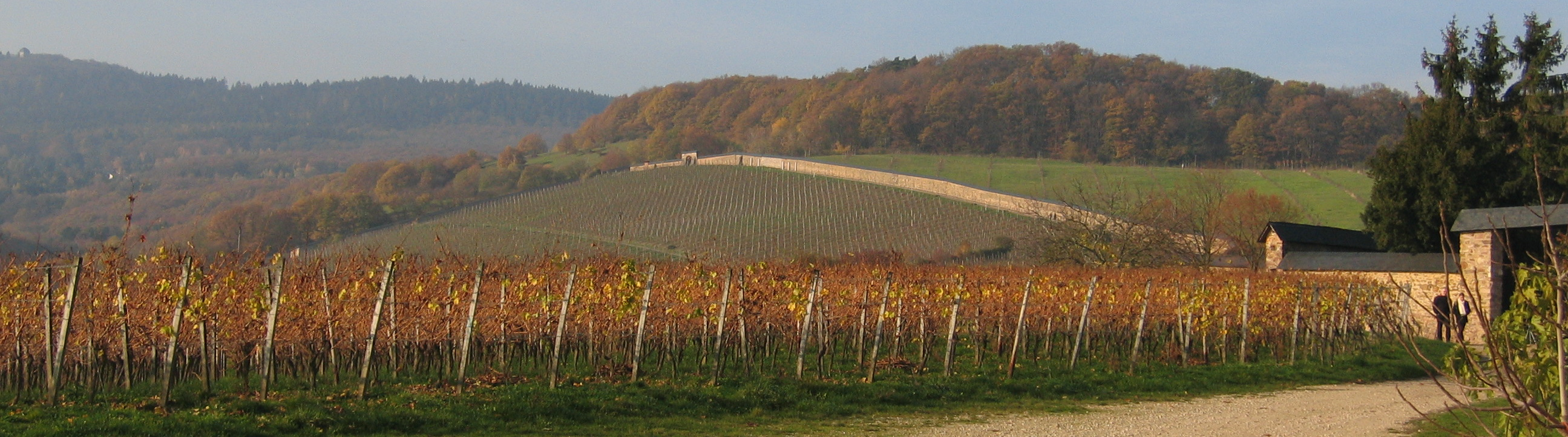
A view from the inside of the Steinberg vineyard, with the wall in the distance and one of the gates on the far right.

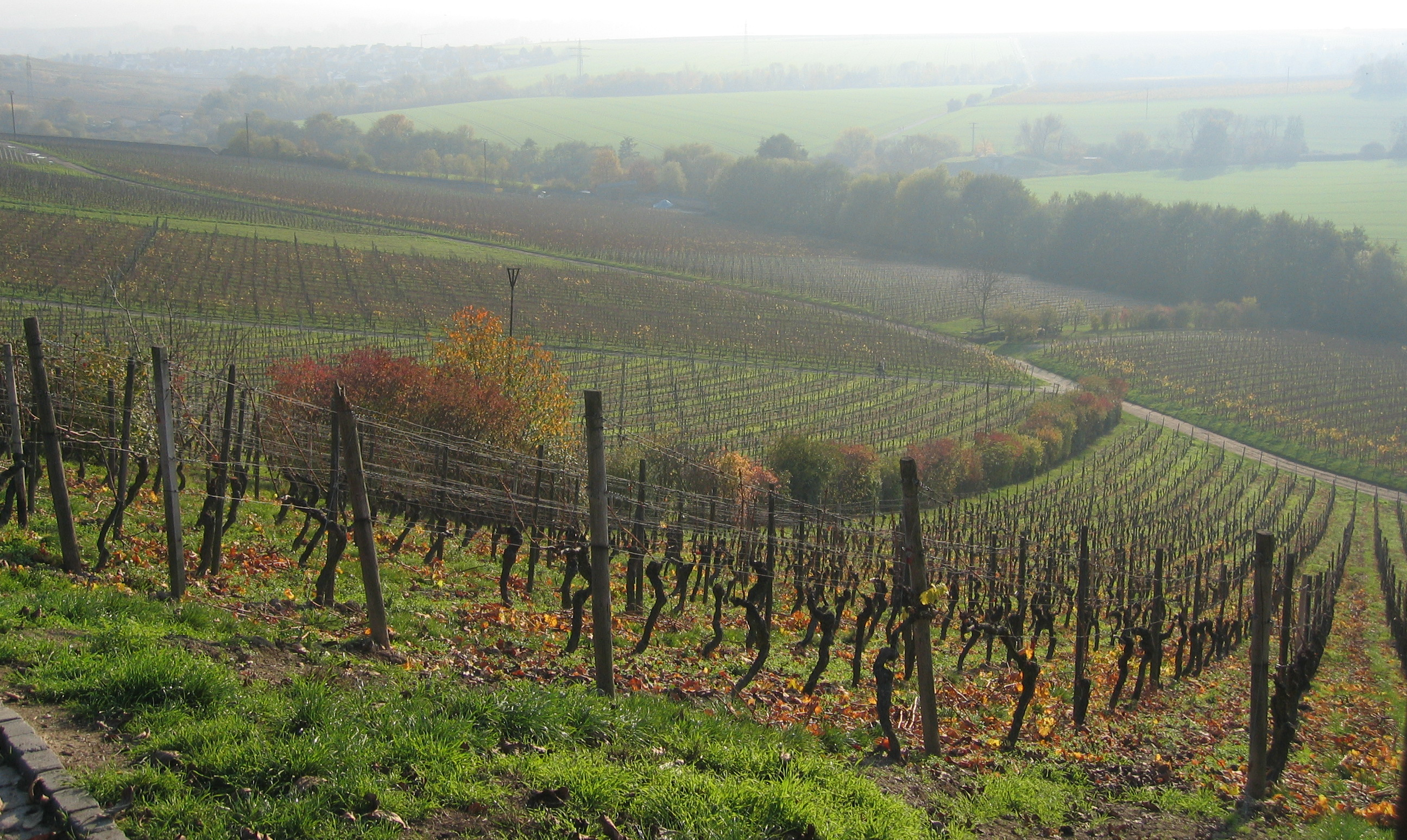
Steinberg Rheingau

Steinberg, Kloster Eberbach

Steinberg (German pronunciation: [ˈʃtaɪ̯nˌbɛʁk]) is a 32.4 hectares (80 acres) wall-enclosed vineyard (a Clos, using French terminology) near Hattenheim in the Rheingau. It is the largest wall-enclosed vineyard in Germany.

Steinberg is one of handful single vineyard sites in Germany which for reasons of historical significance have dispensation from having to include a village name together with the vineyard's name, so the wines from Steinberg are simply labelled Steinberger.

The vineyard belongs to the government-owned Hessische Staatsweingüter (Hessian State Wineries) and is today planted with only Riesling vines.

== History ==
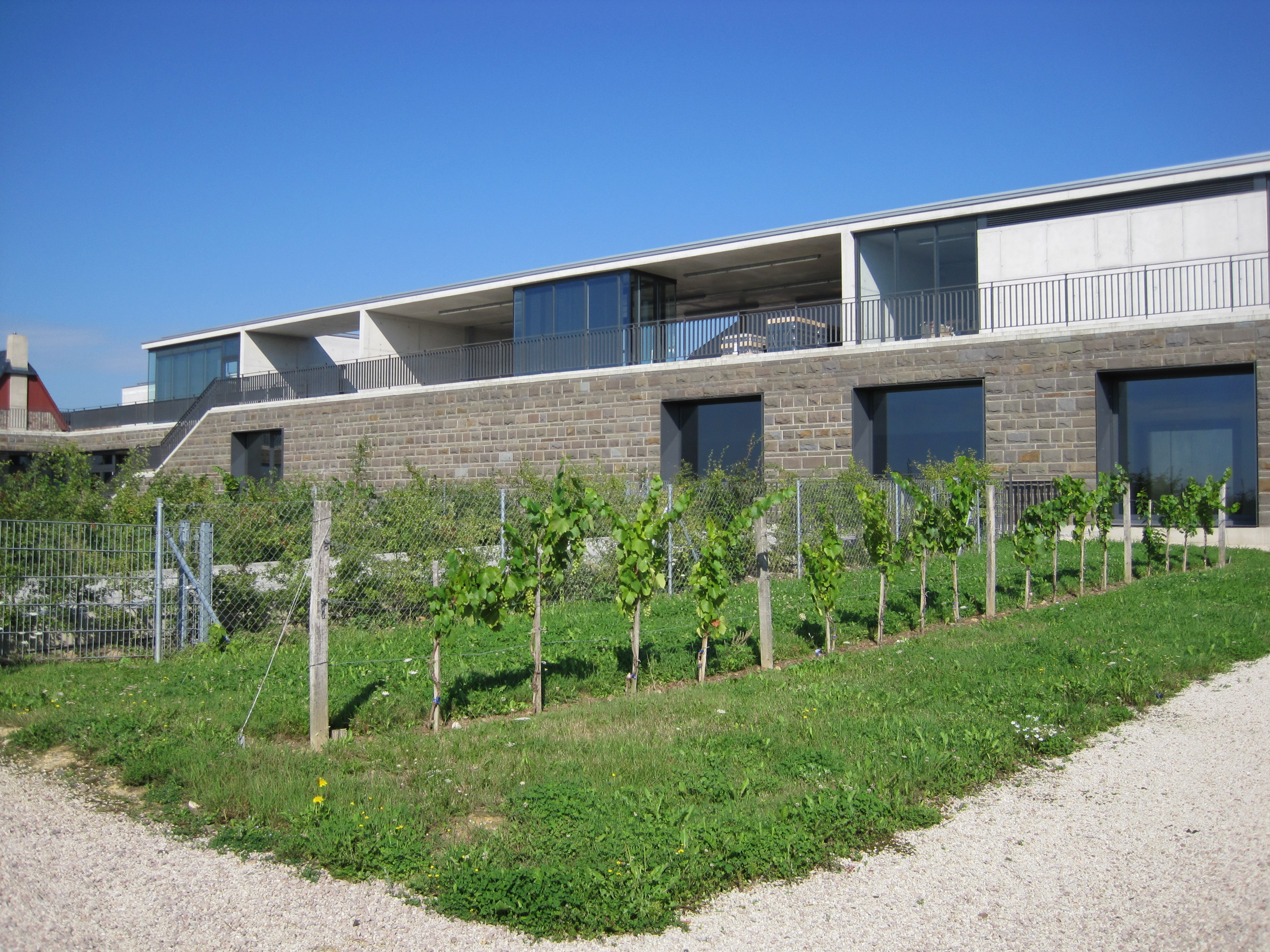
New building of the Hessische Staatsweingüter

It was founded around 1170 by Cistercian monks of nearby Eberbach Abbey (Kloster Eberbach). The 2600 meter long wall encircling the vineyard was completed in 1767.

The new winemaking facility of the owner Hessische Staatsweingüter was built just outside the wall of Steinberg. It is now the central cellar of the state wineries and was put into operation here in 2008. Since then the Steinberg has become the operating centre of the largest winery in Hesse.

The Steinberg Cellar was built from 2006 to 2008 according to the plans of the architect Reinhard Moster from Neustadt an der Weinstraße at a cost of 15,800,000 euros. It occupies a floor space of 64 meters by 83 meters and extends from the level of the courtyard with three floors to 14 meters in depth. The top of the cellar was covered with a two-meter thick layer of earth. It has a storage capacity of 1,300,000 bottles and provides 1,800,000 litres of tank space. On half a hectare the vines grow above the cellar. Up to 140.000 kg grapes per day can be processed in the facilities.

== The name Steinberg ==
The name Steinberg is German for "stony hill" after Stein = stone and Berg = mountain or hill. Although Steinberg is surrounded by a stone wall, the name actually refers to the vineyard's stony soil, rather than to the wall. The name was originally used for only a part of the vineyard, but later became the name of the entire area.

The name Steinberg is also used for several other single vineyard sites in Germany. However, for all these other vineyards, the name Steinberg will be used together with a village name, such as Durbacher Steinberg (in Baden) or Niederhäuser Steinberg (in Nahe).

== Wines ==
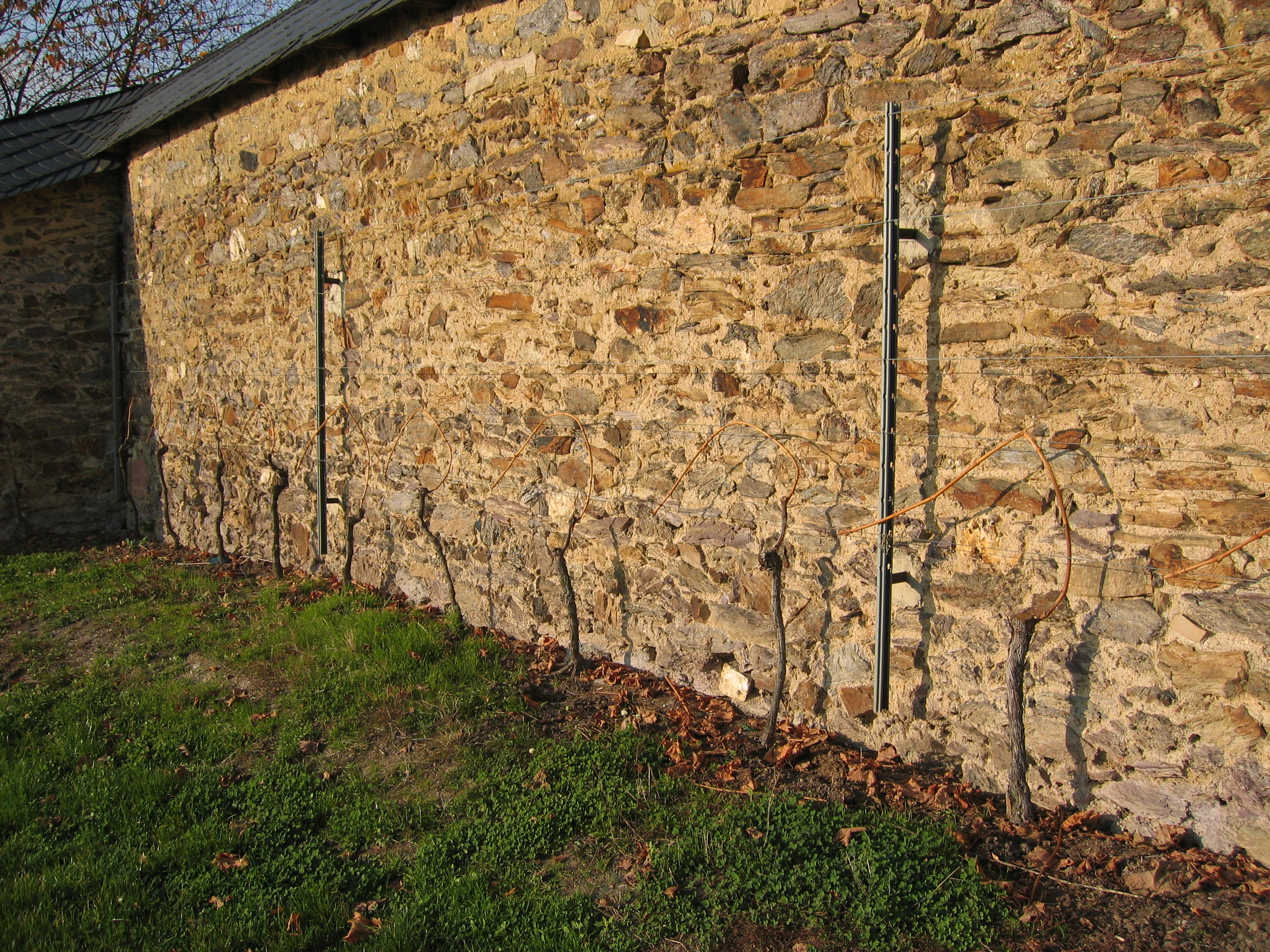
Vines next to the wall that are used to produce Mauerwein.

The Hessian State Wineries produces wines of many different styles from Steinberg, both dry, semi-sweet and sweet Rieslings. The vineyard is classified as an Erste Lage and therefore may be used for the production of dry wines using the Erstes Gewächs designation. Some of the Steinberg grapes are used for small-lot auction wines sold at the biannual wine auctions.

In similarity to many other large, wall-enclosed vineyards such as Clos de Vougeot, the entire vineyard is not homogeneous in quality. The slope varies between 15% and 35% inside the wall, which results in differences in sun exposure and drainage. Typically, different parcels (sub-areas) of Steinberg will be used for wines of different types. A parcel named Zehntstück, located in the middle slope, is the source for the best dry wines in most vintages. A row of vines just inside the wall are trained in an espalier fashion directly against the stone wall, and these vines have a markedly different microclimate because of the heat reflected by the stones. The grapes from these vines are harvested separately and are made into small amounts of Mauerwein ("wall wine"), which typically only are found at the wine auctions.
