= Clos des Lambrays =

Coordinates: 47°11′54″N 4°57′35″E

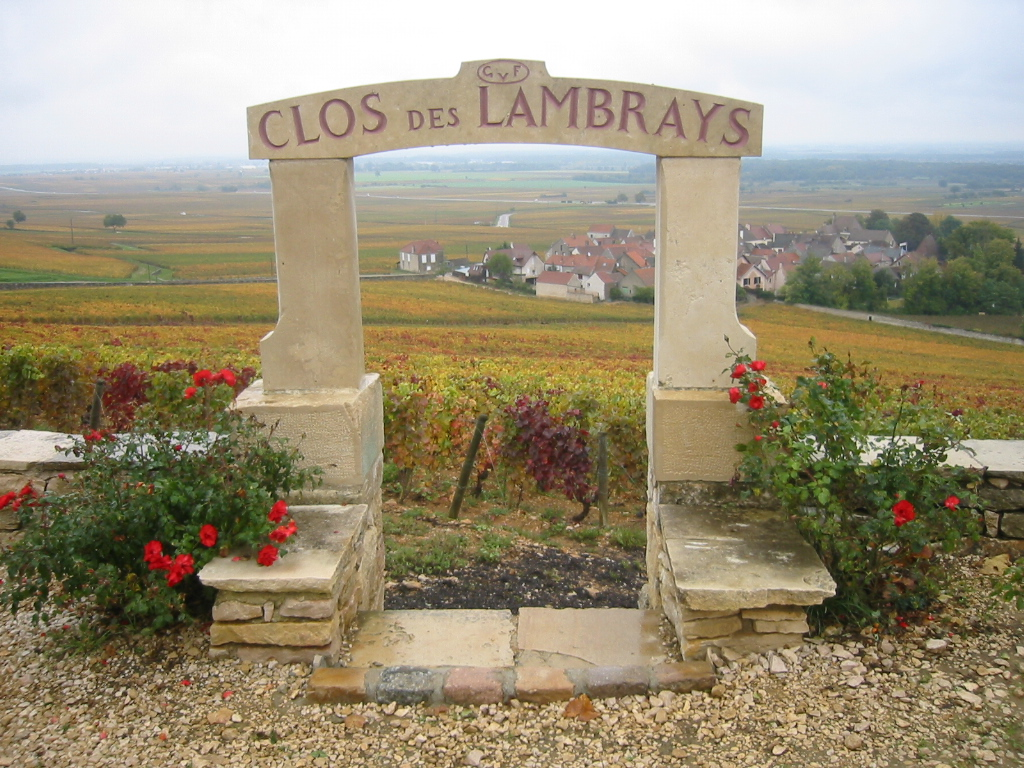
Clos des Lambrays as seen from above. The village of Morey-Saint-Denis in the background.

Clos des Lambrays is an Appellation d'origine contrôlée (AOC) and Grand Cru vineyard for red wine in the Côte de Nuits subregion of Burgundy, with Pinot noir as the main grape variety. It is situated in the commune of Morey-Saint-Denis in the Côte-d'Or département, and is located immediately to the southwest of the village Morey-Saint-Denis. The Clos part of its name refers to a wall-enclosed vineyard. Clos des Lambrays was elevated from premier cru to grand cru status in 1981, which meant that it was created as a separate AOC.

Clos de Lambrays totals 8.84 hectares (21.8 acres) and most of it (8.66 hectares (21.4 acres)) is owned by the winery Domaine des Lambrays. However, Domaine Taupenot-Merme also has a small holding in this vineyard, so Domaine des Lambrays is unable to put a "Monopole" label on its bottles.

== Production ==
In 2008, 7.04 hectares (17.4 acres) of vineyard surface was in production within the AOC, and 236 hectoliters of wine were produced, corresponding to slightly over 31,000 bottles.

== AOC regulations ==
The main grape variety for Clos des Lambrays is Pinot noir. The AOC regulations also allow up to 15 per cent total of Chardonnay, Pinot blanc and Pinot gris as accessory grapes, but this is practically never used for any Burgundy Grand Cru vineyard. Since 2011, the allowed base yield is 42 hectoliters per hectare. A minimum planting density of 9,000 vines per hectare is required as well as a minimum must weight of 198 g/L and minimum acquired alcohol of 11.5%.

== See also ==
- List of Burgundy Grand Crus
