= Niersteiner Glöck =

German vineyard

Coordinates: 49.870671°N 8.3386916°E

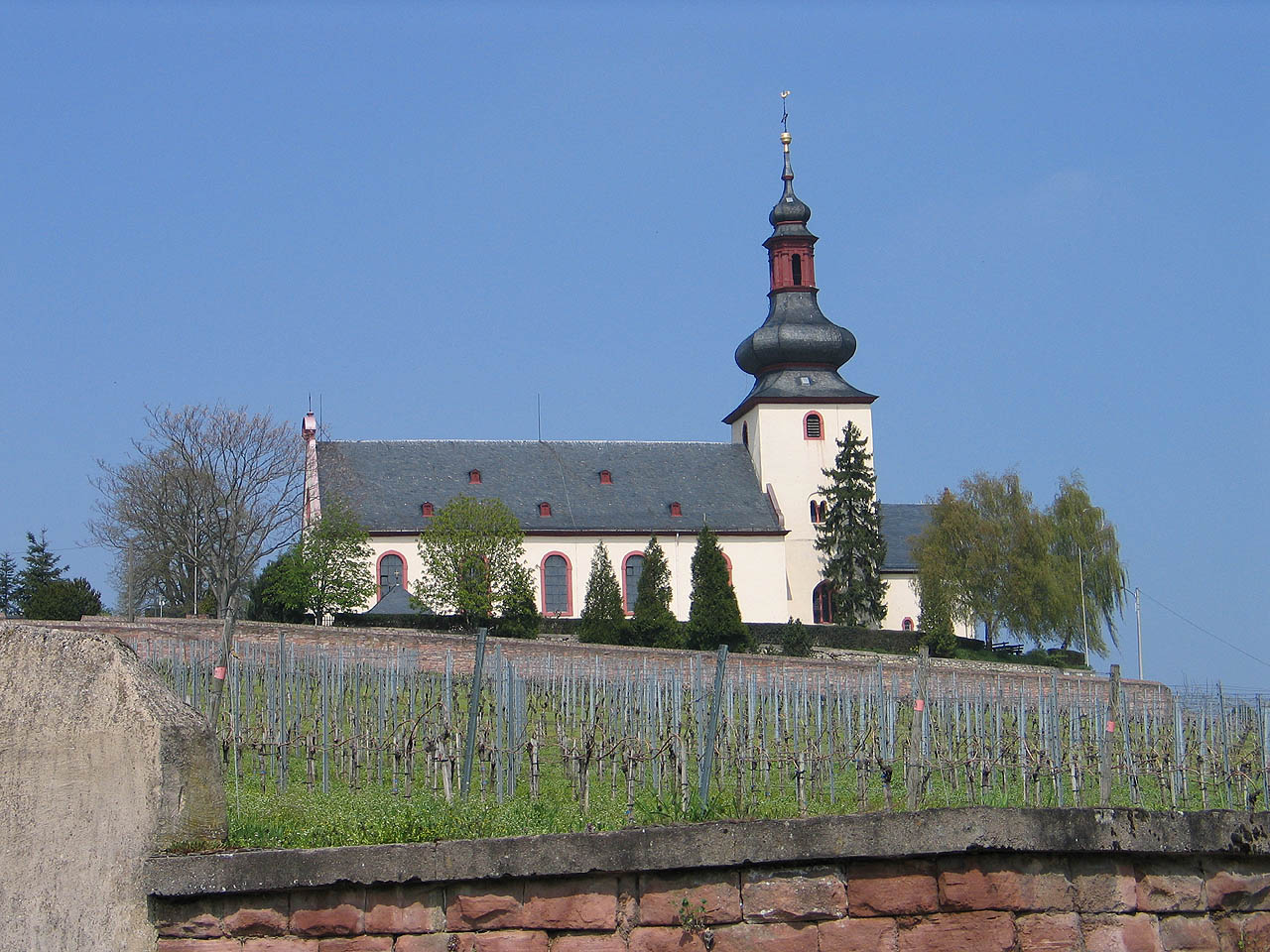
A view to the inside of the Glöck vineyard, with the wall and the church St. Kilian.

Niersteiner Glöck is a 2.1 hectares (5.2 acres) wall-enclosed vineyard (a Clos, using French terminology) in Nierstein in Rheinhessen, Germany. According to a legend it is the oldest named vineyard site in Germany.

Glöck is one of handful single vineyard sites in Germany which for reasons of historical significance have dispensation from having to include a village name together with the vineyard's name, so the wines from the Glöck vineyard site are simply labelled Glöck.

Since 1925, the vineyard belongs exclusively to the Staatliche Weinbaudomäne Oppenheim (State Domain Oppenheim Winery), which is owned by the government of the state of Rhineland-Palatinate, and is part of the Dienstleistungszentrum Ländlicher Raum Rheinhessen-Nahe-Hunsrück (Service Centre Rural Zone Rheinhessen-Nahe-Hunsrück). The vineyard is currently planted with Riesling and Pinot noir vines.

== Wines ==
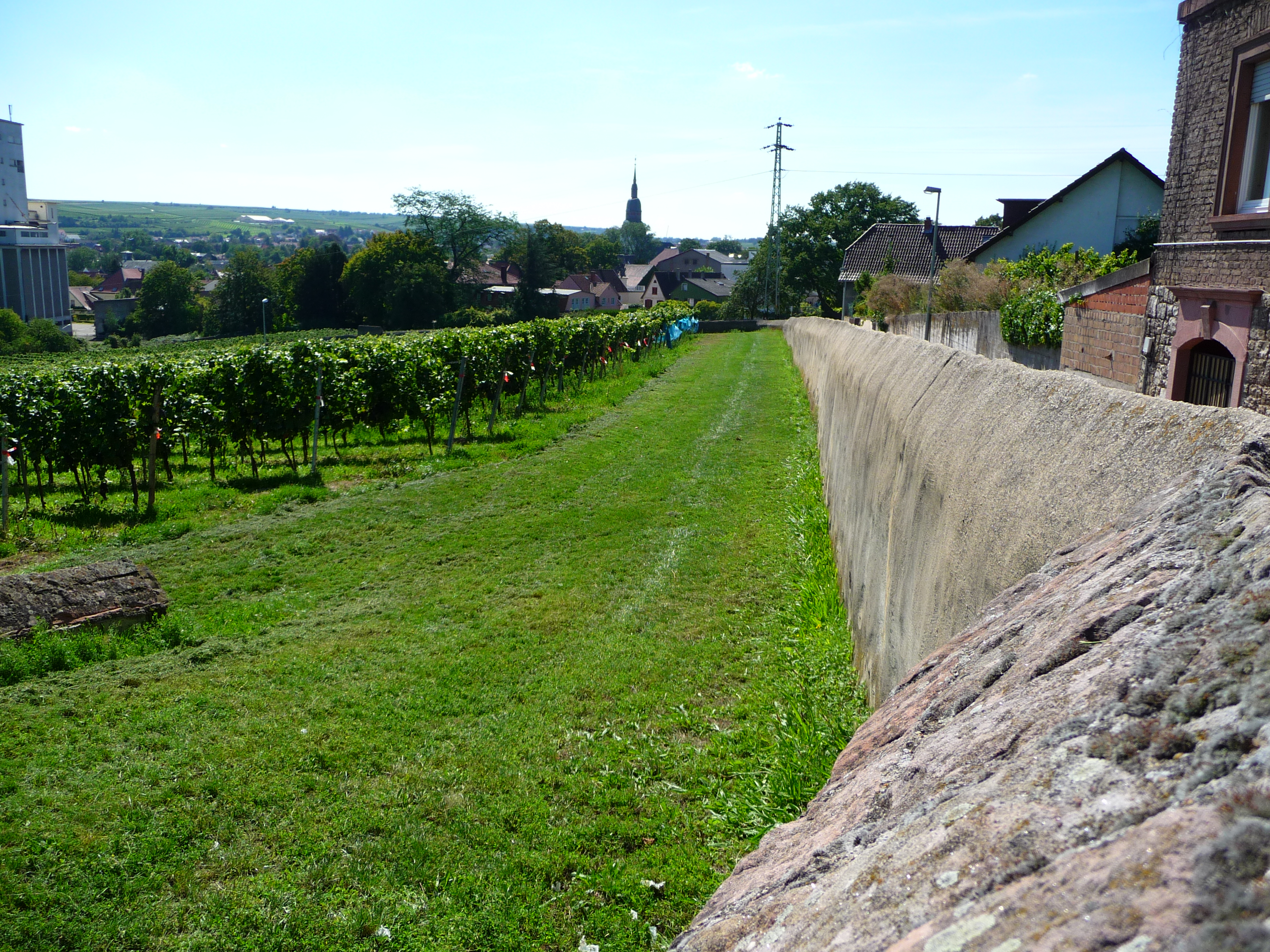
Vines next to the wall with view to Martinskirche.

The Niersteiner Glöck is classified as a "Großes Gewächs Rheinhessen" vineyard by the Verband Deutscher Prädikatsweingüter (VDP).

Due to its small size the entire vineyard is homogeneous in quality. It is situated at height of 90 - 130 meter above the sea level. The slope gradient of 20% and the microclimate resulting from the protection of a centuries old stone wall which completely surrounds the vineyard, allow for the production of high quality grapes. The resulting wines are characterised by a balance of fruit, floral, and mineral notes. Geologically, the vineyard is situated on the Rotliegend formation with a light sandy loess layer.

== History and name ==
The name Glöck is documented by a deed of donation from the year 742, which makes it the oldest single vineyard in Germany to be known continuously under the same name. At the time of the donation Carloman, the eldest son of Charles Martel, majordomo or mayor of the palace and duke of the Franks, brother of King Pepin the Short, donated the Marienkirche (Our Ladies Church, later Kilians church) in Nierstein, including the vineyard, to the diocese of Würzburg. As a result, the farmers of the vineyard had to pay the tithe to the prince-bishop in Würzburg. This tithe consisted of fruit and wine. Since then the site has been continuously under vine. The wall encircling the vineyard was completed in 1761.

The vineyard is presumed to take its name from the church and its bells, but it is unclear whether the name is derived from the ringing of the bell or because the church bell ringer was paid with the wine from the vineyard. The name, however, indicates the special relationship between the vineyard and the church. The adjacent Kilianskirche is still surrounded by the vineyards of this site.
