= Cattier =

French Champagne house

Coordinates: 49.1570502°N 4.0616196°E

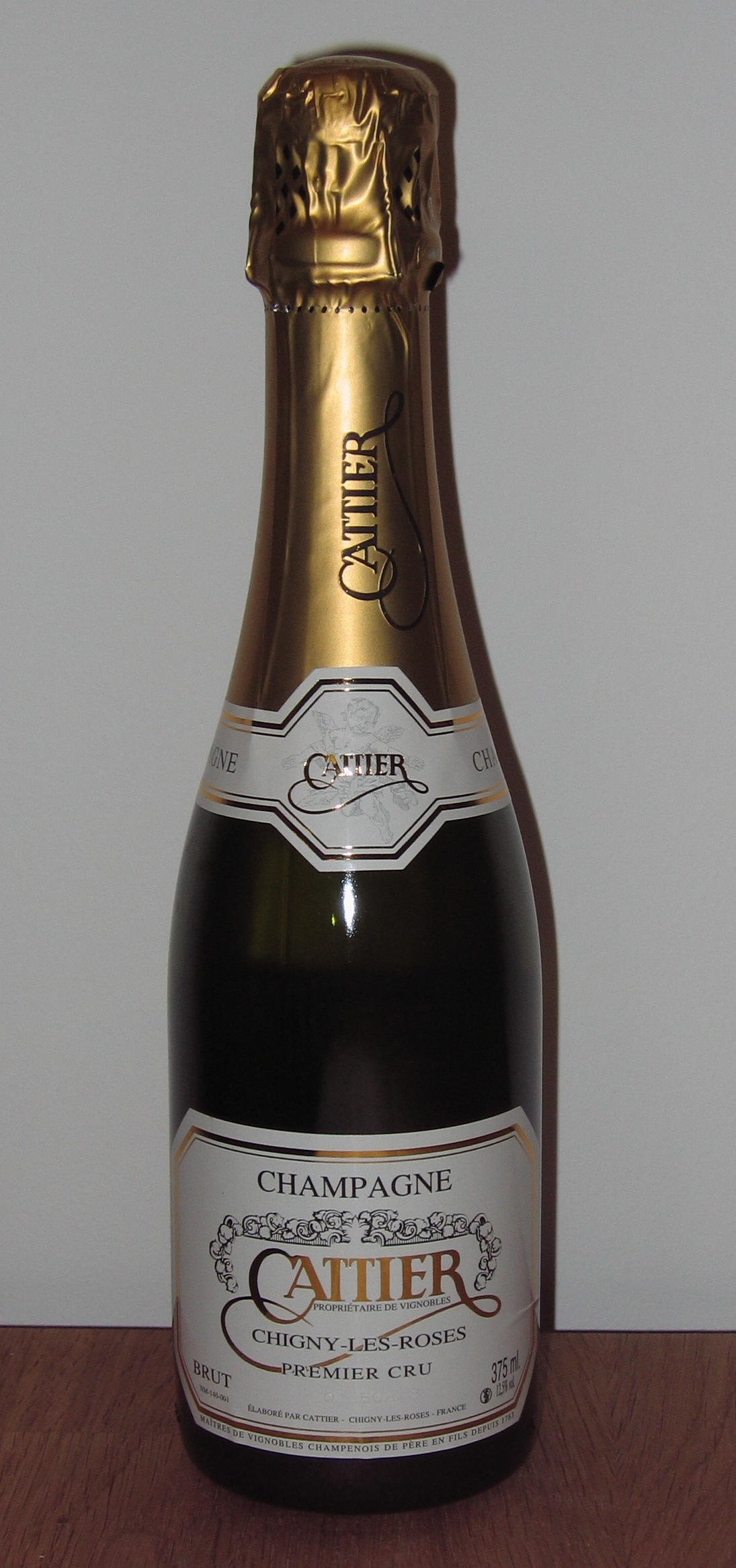
Champagne Cattier

Cattier (or Champagne Cattier) is a family-owned Champagne house located in Chigny-les-Roses, a Premier Cru village of the Montagne de Reims, part of Champagne, France. The Cattier family has owned vineyards since 1625, and has been running the House for over 13 generations.

They expanded into the Indian market in 2013.

== Family history ==
In 1916 Jean Cattier had to leave the battlefront because of a severe war injury. He came back to Chigny-les-Roses, where his family had been growing vines since 1625. The city of Reims, besieged by the German army, crumbled under the shells and 60% of the city was destroyed. Champagne merchants were trying to keep a modest activity in these tough conditions, but could not get grapes in the nearby vineyards. In order not to lose his 1916 paltry harvest, Jean Cattier decided to produce his own champagne. The first bottles were released in 1918 to celebrate the end of World War I.

In 1936 his son Jean Cattier married Nelly. They had three children: Jean-Louis, Liliane and Jean-Jacques. They made the activity grow, shared their passion and then passed the company to their children. Jean-Louis took charge of the vineyard in the early 1960s, after having done his military service in Algeria. Liliane took care of the office duties and welcomed customers. Jean-Jacques, as an oenologist, was in charge of the wine-making process, and then dealt with the administrative and trade management.

In 1951 Jean Cattier acquired the Clos du Moulin, one of the rare historical clos in the Champagne region. He restored this 2.2 hectares parcel that was destroyed during the wars. He produced his first wine out of this parcel in 1952, his first bottling in 1953 and his first sale in 1956. It was, at the time, one of the two clos produced and sold in the Champagne region. Jean Cattier was then considered as a precursor for two main reasons: creating a cuvée that was both a clos and a prestigious champagne.

In 2011 Alexandre Cattier took over from his father, Jean-Jacques Cattier. He and his cousins, Agathe and Marie, daughters of respectively Liliane and Jean-Louis, are still running the company.

== Cellars and architecture ==
The cellars of Champagne Cattier are located in Rilly-la-Montagne, with a storage capacity of 2 million bottles. Historically the depth of Champagne cellars is estimated by the number of steps, since no one has bothered to measure it. With their 119 steps (27 meters), the cellars of Champagne Cattier are the deepest, just before those of the House Vranken-Pommery Monopole that are composed of 116 steps.

Champagne Cattier's cellars have the particularity of being dug on three levels. Each level shows characteristics of a specific era : Gothic, Romanesque and Renaissance. During WWII the cellars were used as shelters from the bombings.

== See also ==
- List of Champagne houses
