= Moussy, Marne =

Moussy
- Commune
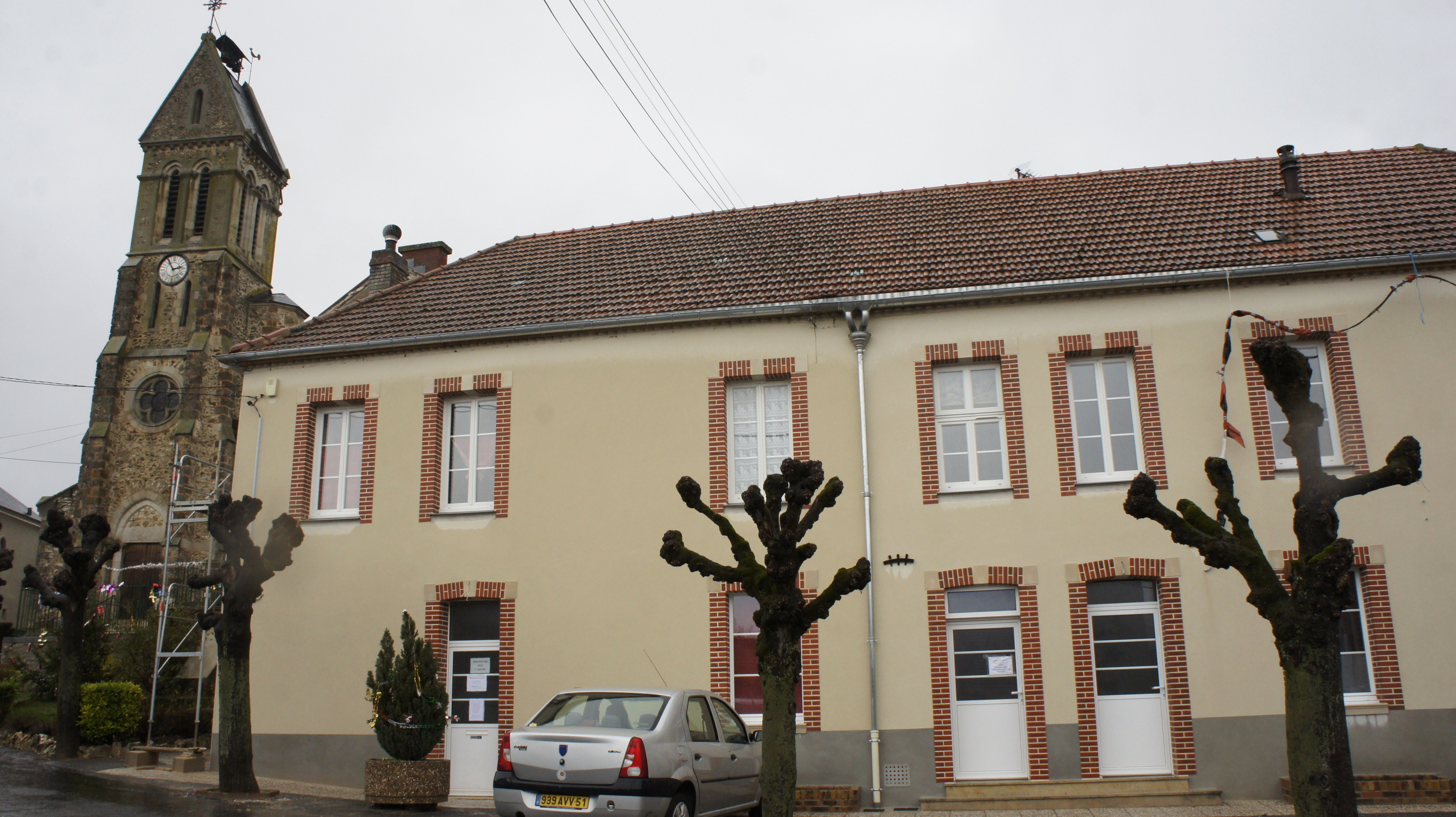
- The church and town hall in Moussy
- Location of Moussy
- Location within France Location within Grand Est
- Coordinates: 49°00′55″N 3°55′22″E
- Country: France
- Region: Grand Est
- Department: Marne
- Arrondissement: Épernay
- Canton: Épernay-2
- Intercommunality: CA Épernay, Coteaux et Plaine de Champagne

Government
  - Mayor (2020–2026): François Lejeune
- Area^{1}: 2.81 km^{2} (1.08 sq mi)
- Elevation: 75 m (246 ft)
- Population (2023): 725
  - Density: 258/km^{2} (668/sq mi)
- Time zone: UTC+01:00 (CET)
  - Summer (DST): UTC+02:00 (CEST)
- INSEE/Postal code: 51390 /51530
- ^{1} French Land Register data, which excludes lakes, ponds, glaciers > 1 km^{2} (0.386 sq mi or 247 acres) and river estuaries.

Moussy (French pronunciation: [musi]) is a commune in the Marne department in north-eastern France.

== See also ==
- Communes of the Marne department
