= Hattenheim =

- Stadtteil of Eltville
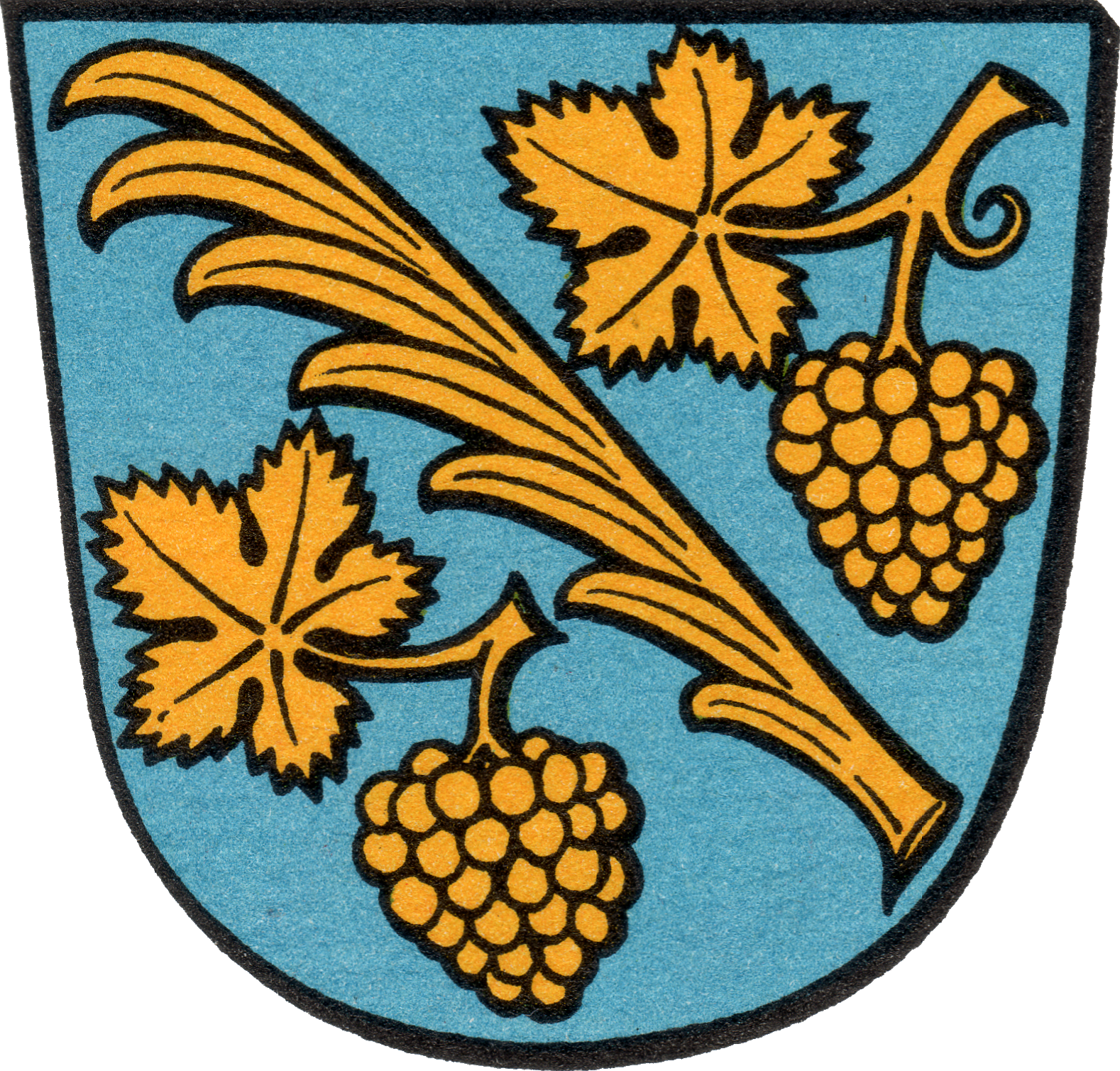
- Coat of arms
- Interactive map of Hattenheim
- Location within Germany Location within Hesse
- Coordinates: 50°0′48″N 8°3′33″E
- Country: Germany
- State: Hesse
- Admin. region: Darmstadt
- District: Rheingau-Taunus-Kreis
- Town: Eltville
- Time zone: UTC+01:00 (CET)
  - Summer (DST): UTC+02:00 (CEST)
- Postal codes: 65347
- Dialling codes: 06723
- Vehicle registration: RÜD
- Website: www.hattenheim.de

Hattenheim is a Stadtteil in Eltville am Rhein, Hesse, Germany. It lies within the Rheingau wine region.

In 954, Hattenheim is referred to as Villula, meaning "little town".

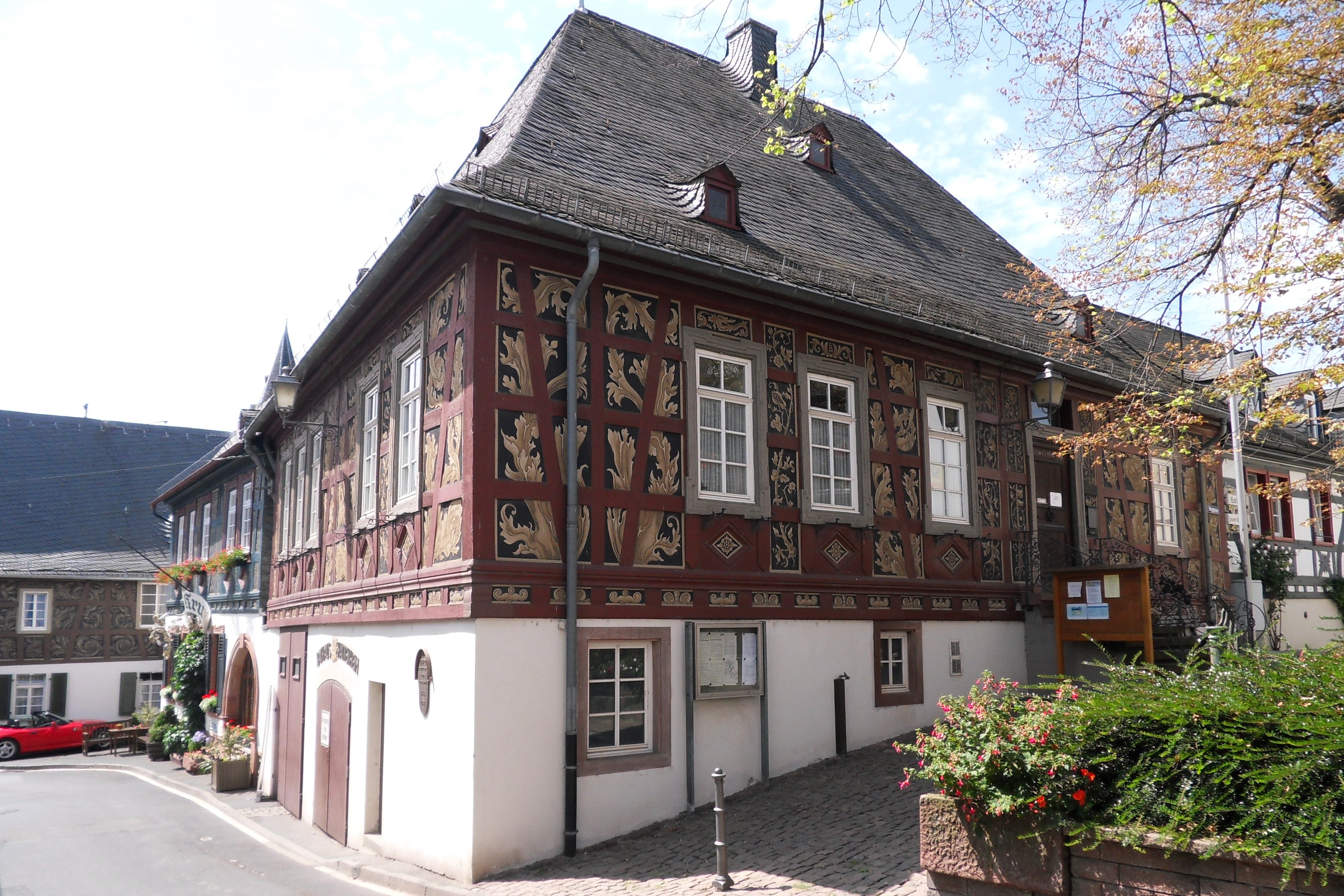
Former Town Hall of Hattenheim. Late 18th century.

== Points of interest ==
- Burg Hattenheim
- Eberbach Abbey (Kloster Eberbach)
- Schloss Reichartshausen
- Steinberg, Kloster Eberbach
