= Pommery =

Champagne house in Reims, France

Coordinates: 49°14′33″N 04°03′09″E

- Traded as: CAC All-Share
- Industry: Manufacture of wine from grape food and tobacco industry

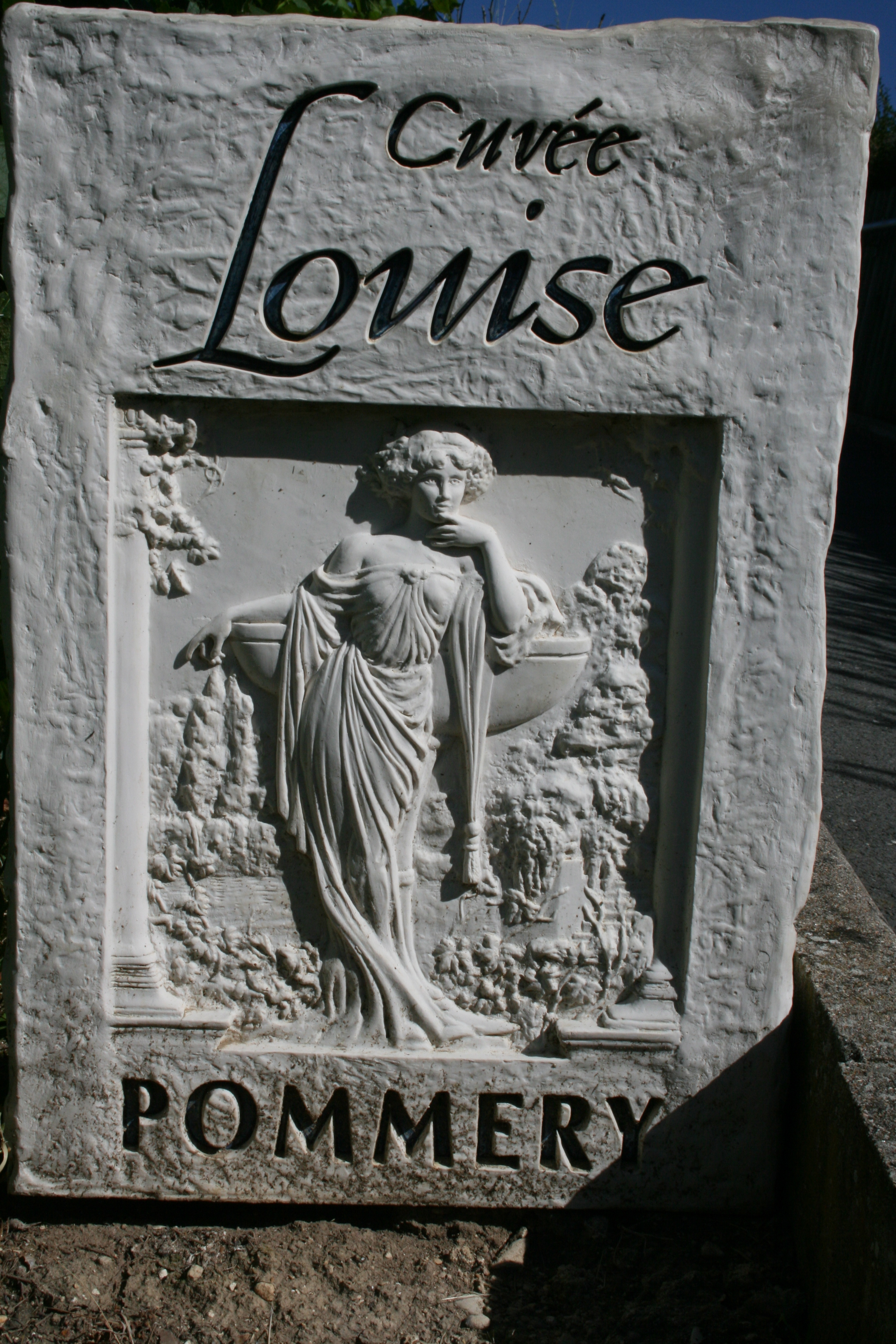
Cuvée Louise, top brand of house Pommery

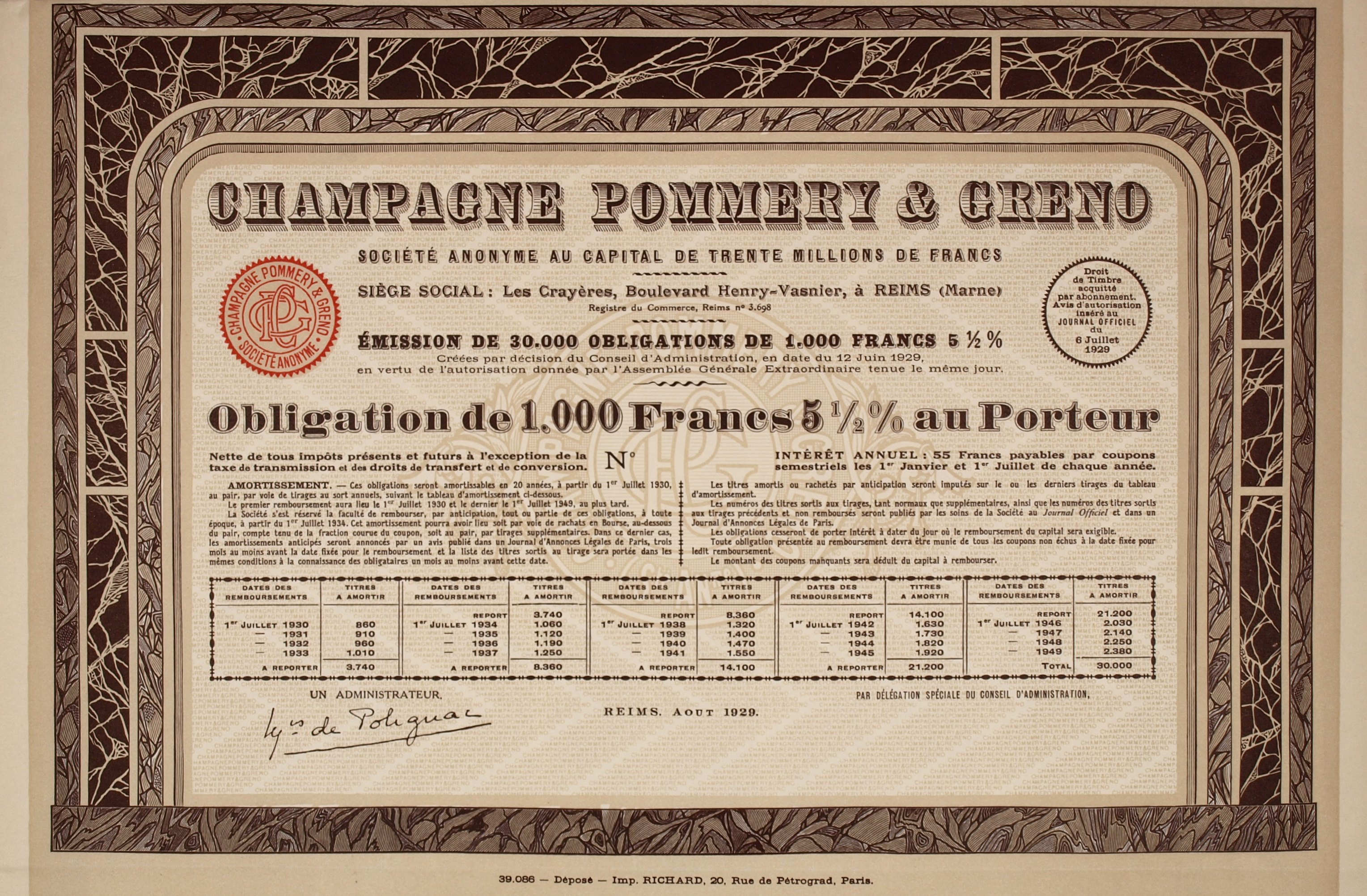
Bond of the Champagne Pommery & Greno S.A., issued August 1929

Champagne Pommery is a Champagne house located in Reims. The house was founded as Pommery & Greno in 1858 by Alexandre Louis Pommery and Narcisse Greno with the primary business being wool trading. Under the guidance of Alexandre's widow, Louise Pommery, the firm was dedicated to Champagne production and soon became one of the region's largest Champagne brands. Champagne Pommery was the first house to commercialize a brut Champagne in 1874.

It is possible to visit this Champagne cellar and also the Villa Demoiselle, just in front of Champagne Pommery House in Reims.

Pommery is currently owned by the Vranken-Pommery Monopole Group (located in Reims), which also owns Heidsieck & Co Monopole and Vranken, Château la Gordonne, Domaine Royal de Jarras, Rozès, and Louis Pommery in their portfolio.

In August 2022, Pommery announced a collaboration with Japanese rock star Yoshiki as the brand's first co-release with a celebrity artist.

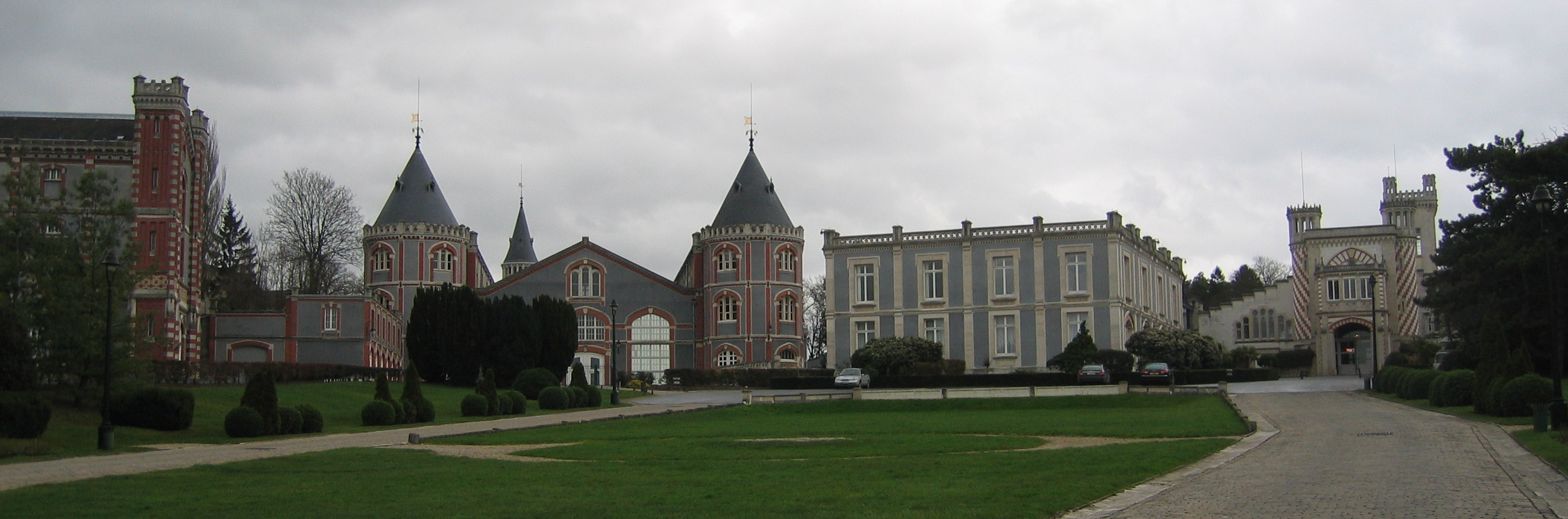
The facilities of Champagne Pommery in Reims
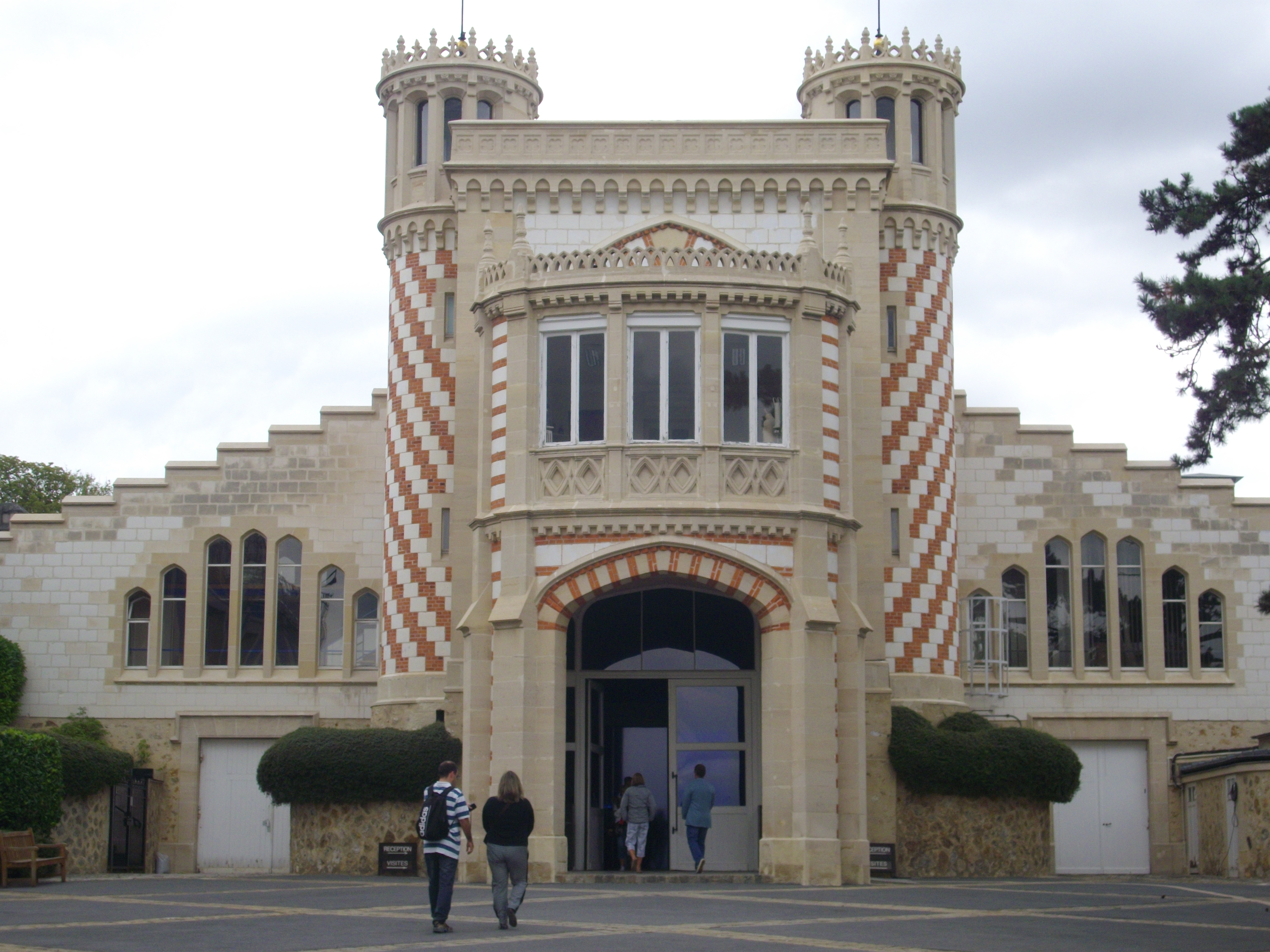
Entrance to the Pommery Cellars

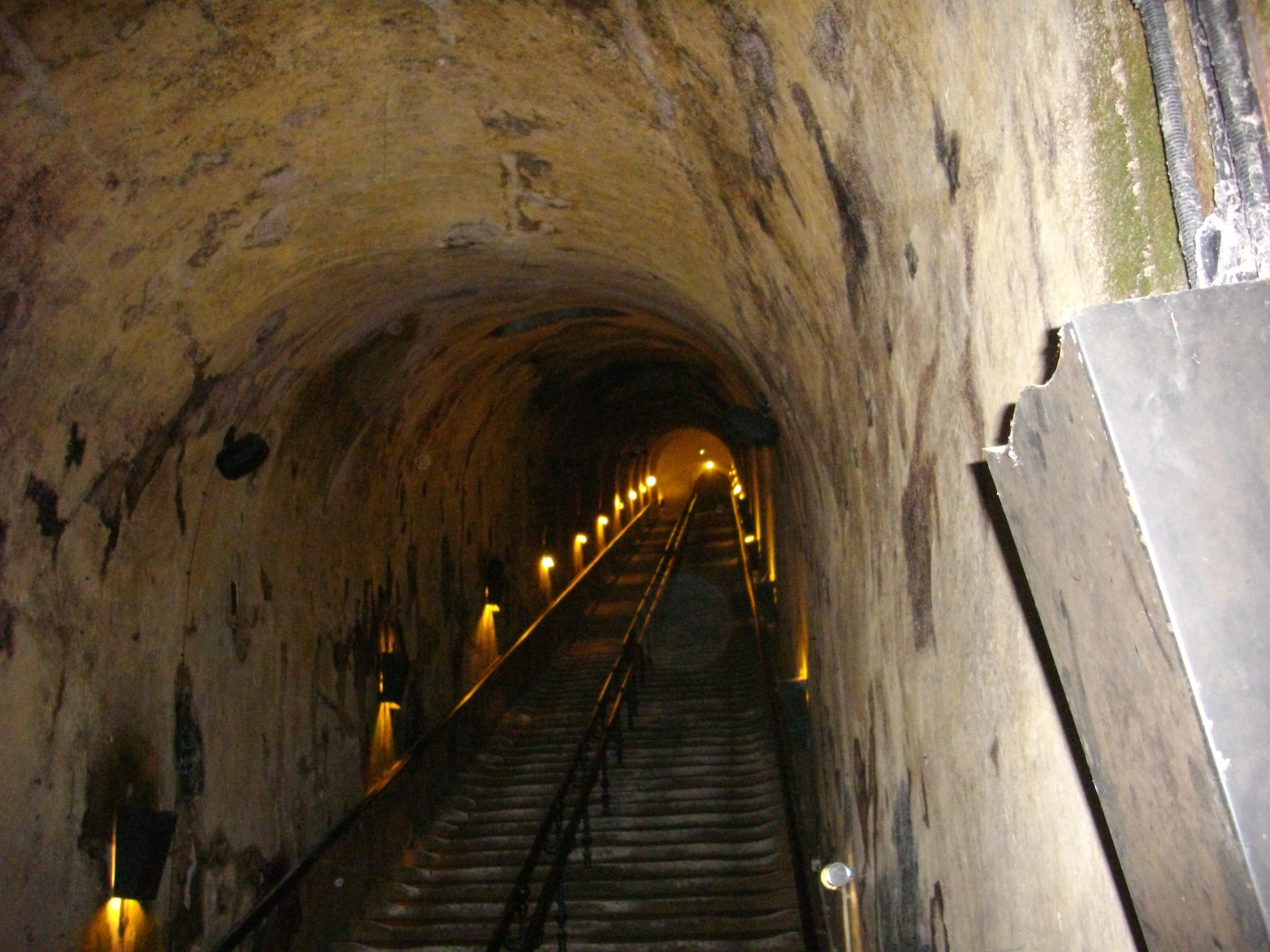

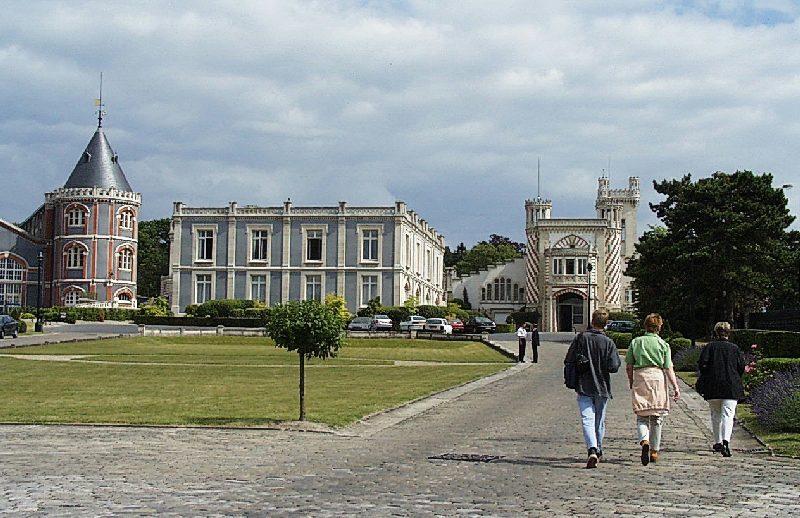
Pommery's Tudor domain in Reims

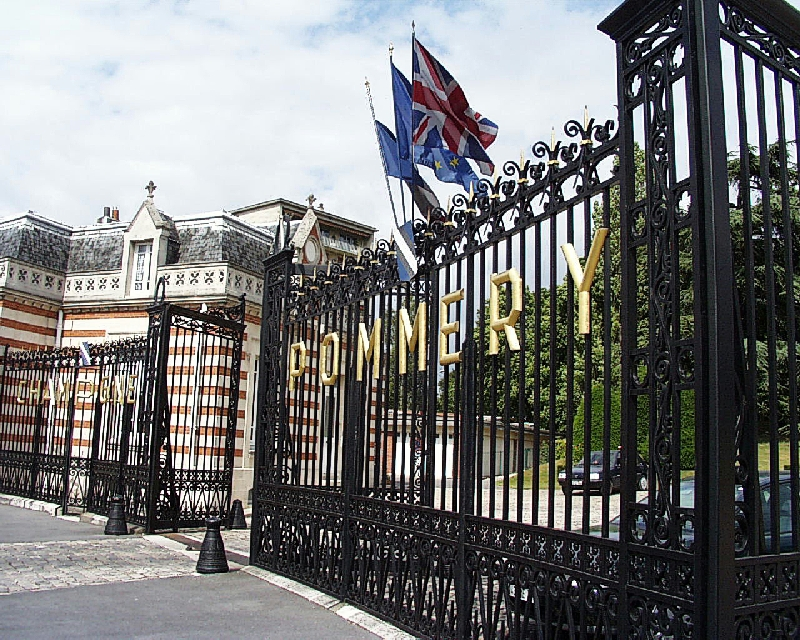

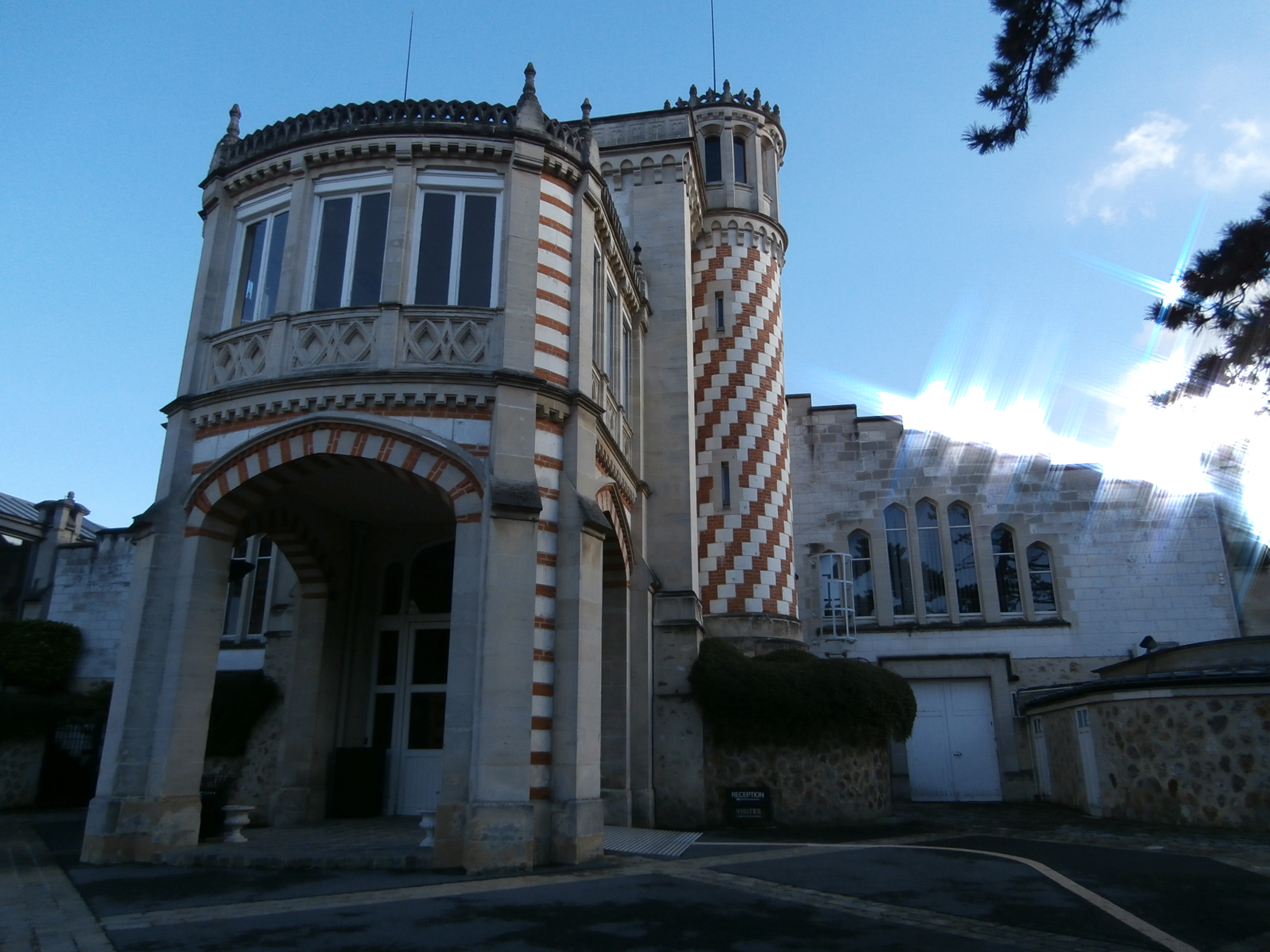

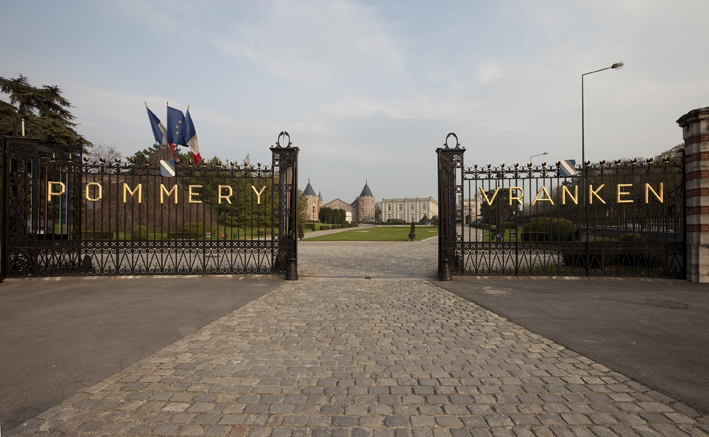

== See also ==
- List of Champagne houses
