= Chigny-les-Roses =

- Commune
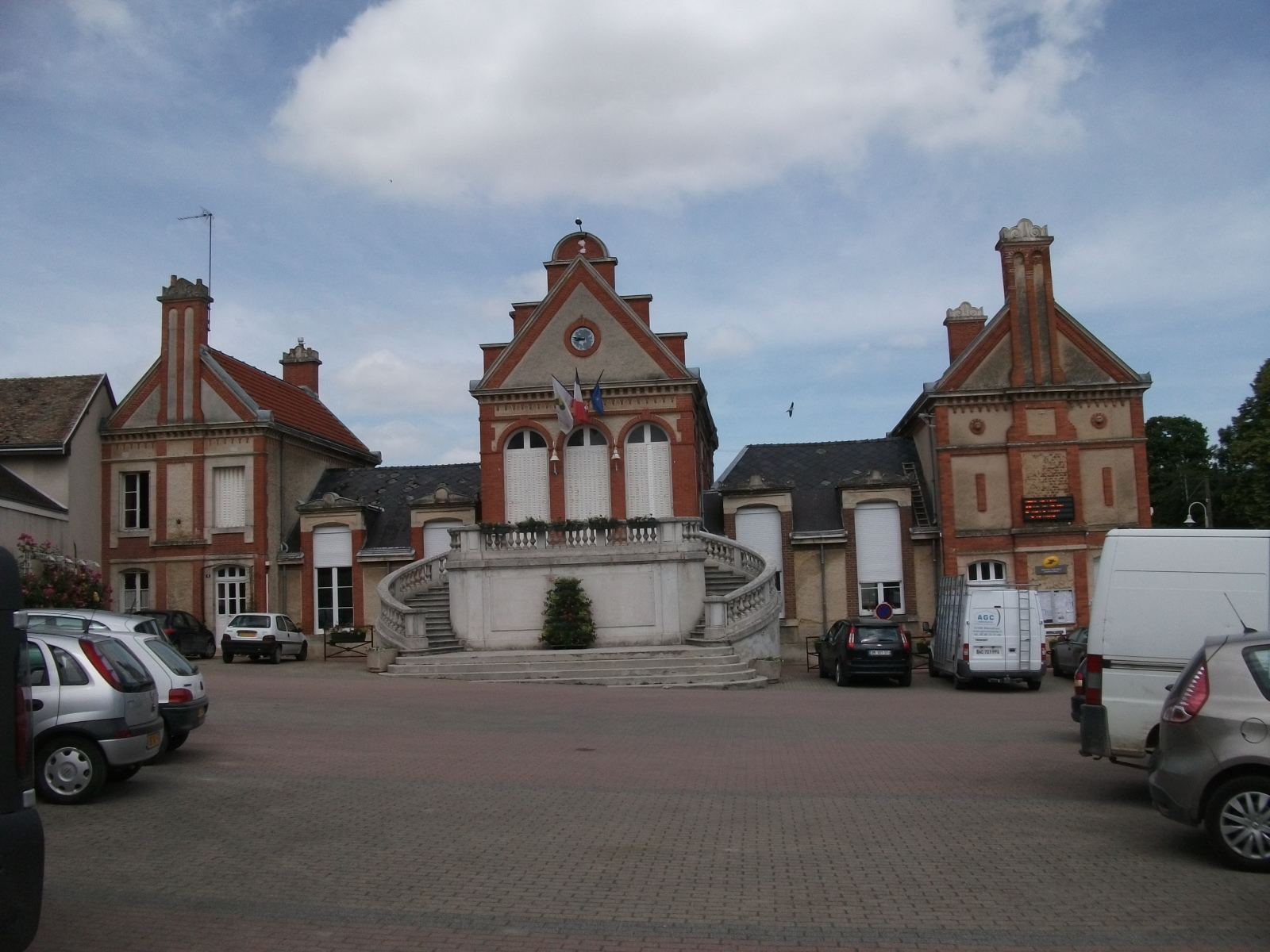
- The town hall in Chigny-les-Roses

- Coat of arms
- Location of Chigny-les-Roses
- Location within France Location within Grand Est
- Coordinates: 49°09′22″N 4°03′49″E
- Country: France
- Region: Grand Est
- Department: Marne
- Arrondissement: Reims
- Canton: Mourmelon-Vesle et Monts de Champagne
- Intercommunality: CU Grand Reims

Government
  - Mayor (2020–2026): Vincent Guy
- Area^{1}: 4.38 km^{2} (1.69 sq mi)
- Elevation: 151 m (495 ft)
- Population (2023): 521
  - Density: 119/km^{2} (308/sq mi)
- Time zone: UTC+01:00 (CET)
  - Summer (DST): UTC+02:00 (CEST)
- INSEE/Postal code: 51152 /51500
- ^{1} French Land Register data, which excludes lakes, ponds, glaciers > 1 km^{2} (0.386 sq mi or 247 acres) and river estuaries.

Chigny-les-Roses (French pronunciation: [ʃiɲi le ʁoz]) is a commune in the Marne department in north-eastern France. The village is classified as a Premier Cru (1er Cru) in the Champagne wine region. It is known primarily for producing quality Pinot Meunier and Pinot Noir.

== See also ==
- Cattier
- Communes of the Marne department
- Montagne de Reims Regional Natural Park
