= List of Rheingau vineyards =

The Rheingau wine region, located in the state of Hesse, is one of the 13 regions (Anbaugebiete) for quality wine in Germany. For each of the quality wine regions, the state where it is located keeps a formal vineyard roll (Weinbergsrolle) which lists all formally recognised vineyards of the region, with detailed surveying maps defining the geographical extent of each vineyard. This list defines which geographical designations may appear on the wine labels under the principles set down by the national wine law. The list includes single vineyard designations (Einzellagen), which are grouped together into collective vineyards (Großlagen). Both single and collective vineyard designations are used together with village names.

The state of Hesse lists the following vineyards. The vineyards are listed broadly from east to west, in the downstream direction of river Rhine.

Single vineyard designation		Collective vineyard designation		Comment
Village name	Vineyard name	Village name	Vineyard name	Comment
Wicker	König-Wilhelmsberg	Hochheim	Daubhaus	
Wicker	Mönchsgewann	Hochheim	Daubhaus	
Wicker	Nonnberg	Hochheim	Daubhaus	
Wicker	Stein	Hochheim	Daubhaus	
Massenheim	Schloßgarten	Hochheim	Daubhaus	
Flörsheim	Herrnberg	Hochheim	Daubhaus	
Flörsheim	St. Anna Kapelle	Hochheim	Daubhaus	
Hochheim	Stielweg	Hochheim	Daubhaus	
Hochheim	Domdechaney	Hochheim	Daubhaus	
Hochheim	Hölle	Hochheim	Daubhaus	
Hochheim	Kirchenstück	Hochheim	Daubhaus	
Hochheim	Hofmeister	Hochheim	Daubhaus	
Hochheim	Königin Victoriaberg	Hochheim	Daubhaus	
Hochheim	Stein	Hochheim	Daubhaus	
Hochheim	Herrnberg	Hochheim	Daubhaus	
Hochheim	Berg	Hochheim or Kostheim	Daubhaus	Kostheim (for the Großlage) may only be used in part of the Einzellage
Hochheim	Reichestal	Hochheim or Kostheim	Daubhaus	Kostheim (for the Großlage) may only be used in part of the Einzellage
Kostheim	Weiß Erd	Hochheim or Kostheim	Daubhaus	
Kostheim	St. Kiliansberg	Hochheim or Kostheim	Daubhaus	
Kostheim	Steig	Hochheim or Kostheim	Daubhaus	
Delkenheim	Grub	Hochheim	Daubhaus	
Dotzheim	Judenkirsch	Rauenthal	Steinmächer	
Schierstein	Dachsberg	Rauenthal	Steinmächer	
Schierstein	Hölle	Rauenthal	Steinmächer	
Frauenstein	Herrnberg	Rauenthal	Steinmächer	
Frauenstein	Marschall	Rauenthal	Steinmächer	
Frauenstein	Homberg	Rauenthal	Steinmächer	
Walluf	Berg-Bildstock	Rauenthal	Steinmächer	
Walluf	Langenstück	Rauenthal	Steinmächer	
Walluf	Oberberg	Rauenthal	Steinmächer	
Walluf	Vitusberg	Rauenthal	Steinmächer	
Walluf	Walkenberg	Rauenthal	Steinmächer	
Walluf	Gottesacker	Rauenthal	Steinmächer	
Martinsthal	Rödchen	Rauenthal	Steinmächer	
Martinsthal	Wildsau	Rauenthal	Steinmächer	
Martinsthal	Langenberg	Rauenthal	Steinmächer	
Rauenthal	Baiken	Rauenthal	Steinmächer	
Rauenthal	Wülfen	Rauenthal	Steinmächer	
Rauenthal	Rothenberg	Rauenthal	Steinmächer	
Rauenthal	Gehrn	Rauenthal	Steinmächer	
Rauenthal	Langenstück	Rauenthal	Steinmächer	
Rauenthal	Nonnenberg	Rauenthal	Steinmächer	
Eltville	Langenstück	Rauenthal	Steinmächer	
Eltville	Rheinberg	Rauenthal	Steinmächer	
Eltville	Sonnenberg	Rauenthal	Steinmächer	
Eltville	Taubenberg	Rauenthal	Steinmächer	
Eltville	Kalbspflicht	Rauenthal	Steinmächer	
Kiedrich	Sandgrub	Kiedrich	Heiligenstock	Part of the Einzellage belongs to Großlage Steinmächer
Kiedrich	Wasseros	Kiedrich	Heiligenstock	
Kiedrich	Gräfenberg	Kiedrich	Heiligenstock	
Kiedrich	Klosterberg	Kiedrich	Heiligenstock	
Kiedrich	Turmberg	Kiedrich	Heiligenstock	
Erbach	Hohenrain	Erbach	Honigberg	
Erbach	Marcobrunn	Erbach	Honigberg	
Erbach	Michelmark	Erbach	Honigberg	
Erbach	Rheinhell	Erbach	Honigberg	Located on the Mariannenaue
Erbach	Schloßberg	Erbach	Honigberg	
Erbach	Siegelsberg	Erbach	Honigberg	
Erbach	Steinmorgen	Erbach	Honigberg	Part of the Einzellage belongs to Großlage Steinmächer
Erbach	-	Erbach	Honigberg	A part of the Großlage Honigberg is not part of any Einzellage
Hattenheim	Engelmannsberg	Hattenheim	Deutelsberg	
Hattenheim	Hassel	Hattenheim	Deutelsberg	
Hattenheim	Heiligenberg	Hattenheim	Deutelsberg	
Hattenheim	Mannberg	Hattenheim	Deutelsberg	
Hattenheim	Nußbrunnen	Hattenheim	Deutelsberg	
Hattenheim	Pfaffenberg	Hattenheim	Deutelsberg	
Hattenheim	Rheingarten	Hattenheim	Deutelsberg	Part of the Einzellage is located on the Mariannenaue
Hattenheim	Schützenhaus	Hattenheim	Deutelsberg	
Hattenheim	Wisselbrunnen	Hattenheim	Deutelsberg	
Steinberg		Hattenheim	Deutelsberg	Does not have to use a village name
Hallgarten	Hendelberg	Hallgarten	Mehrhölzchen	Part of the Einzellage belongs to Großlage Deutelsberg
Hallgarten	Jungfer	Hallgarten	Mehrhölzchen	Part of the Einzellage belongs to Großlage Deutelsberg
Hallgarten	Schönhell	Hallgarten	Mehrhölzchen	
Hallgarten	Würzgarten	Hallgarten	Mehrhölzchen	
Oestrich	Klosterberg	Oestrich	Gottesthal	
Oestrich	Lenchen	Oestrich	Gottesthal	
Oestrich	Doosberg	Oestrich	Gottesthal	
Schloss Reichartshausen		Oestrich	Gottesthal	Does not have to use a village name
Mittelheim	St. Nikolaus	Johannisberg	Erntebringer	
Mittelheim	Edelmann	Johannisberg	Erntebringer	
Mittelheim	Goldberg	Johannisberg	Erntebringer	
Winkel	Dachsberg	Johannisberg	Erntebringer	
Winkel	Gutenberg	Johannisberg	Erntebringer	
Winkel	Hasensprung	Johannisberg	Erntebringer	
Winkel	Jesuitengarten	Johannisberg	Erntebringer	
Winkel	Schloßberg	Johannisberg	Erntebringer	
Schloss Vollrads		Johannisberg	Erntebringer	Does not have to use a village name
Johannisberg	Goldatzel	Johannisberg	Erntebringer	
Johannisberg	Hansenberg	Johannisberg	Erntebringer	
Johannisberg	Hölle	Johannisberg	Erntebringer	
Johannisberg	Klaus	Johannisberg	Erntebringer	
Johannisberg	Mittelhölle	Johannisberg	Erntebringer	
Johannisberg	Schwarzenstein	Johannisberg	Erntebringer	
Johannisberg	Vogelsang	Johannisberg	Erntebringer	
Schloss Johannisberg		Johannisberg	Erntebringer	Does not have to use a village name
Geisenheim	Schloßgarten	Johannisberg	Erntebringer	
Geisenheim	Kilzberg	Johannisberg	Erntebringer	
Geisenheim	Kläuserweg	Johannisberg	Erntebringer	
Geisenheim	Fuchsberg	Rüdesheim or Lorch	Burgweg	
Geisenheim	Mäuerchen	Rüdesheim or Lorch	Burgweg	
Geisenheim	Mönchspfad	Rüdesheim or Lorch	Burgweg	
Geisenheim	Rothenberg	Rüdesheim or Lorch	Burgweg	
Rüdesheim	Berg Kaisersteinfels	Rüdesheim or Lorch	Burgweg	
Rüdesheim	Berg Roseneck	Rüdesheim or Lorch	Burgweg	
Rüdesheim	Berg Rottland	Rüdesheim or Lorch	Burgweg	
Rüdesheim	Berg Schloßberg	Rüdesheim or Lorch	Burgweg	
Rüdesheim	Bischofsberg	Rüdesheim or Lorch	Burgweg	
Rüdesheim	Drachenstein	Rüdesheim or Lorch	Burgweg	
Rüdesheim	Kirchenpfad	Rüdesheim or Lorch	Burgweg	
Rüdesheim	Klosterberg	Rüdesheim or Lorch	Burgweg	
Rüdesheim	Klosterlay	Rüdesheim or Lorch	Burgweg	
Rüdesheim	Magdalenenkreuz	Rüdesheim or Lorch	Burgweg	
Rüdesheim	Rosengarten	Rüdesheim or Lorch	Burgweg	
Lorch	Schloßberg	Rüdesheim or Lorch	Burgweg	
Lorch	Kapellenberg	Rüdesheim or Lorch	Burgweg	
Lorch	Krone	Rüdesheim or Lorch	Burgweg	
Lorch	Pfaffenwies	Rüdesheim or Lorch	Burgweg	
Lorch	Bodental-Steinberg	Rüdesheim or Lorch	Burgweg	
Lorchhausen	Rosenberg	Rüdesheim or Lorch	Burgweg	
Lorchhausen	Seligmacher	Rüdesheim or Lorch	Burgweg	
Assmannshausen	Frankenthal	Assmannshausen	Steil	
Assmannshausen	Höllenberg	Assmannshausen	Steil	
Assmannshausen	Hinterkirch	Assmannshausen	Steil	
Satellites located in other parts of Hesse, but formally counted as part of Rheingau
Felsberg, Hessen	Böddiger Berg	-	-	In northern Hesse
Frankfurt	Lohrberger Hang	-	-	On the outskirts of Frankfurt am Main
