= Rauenthal =

- Ortsbezirk of Eltville
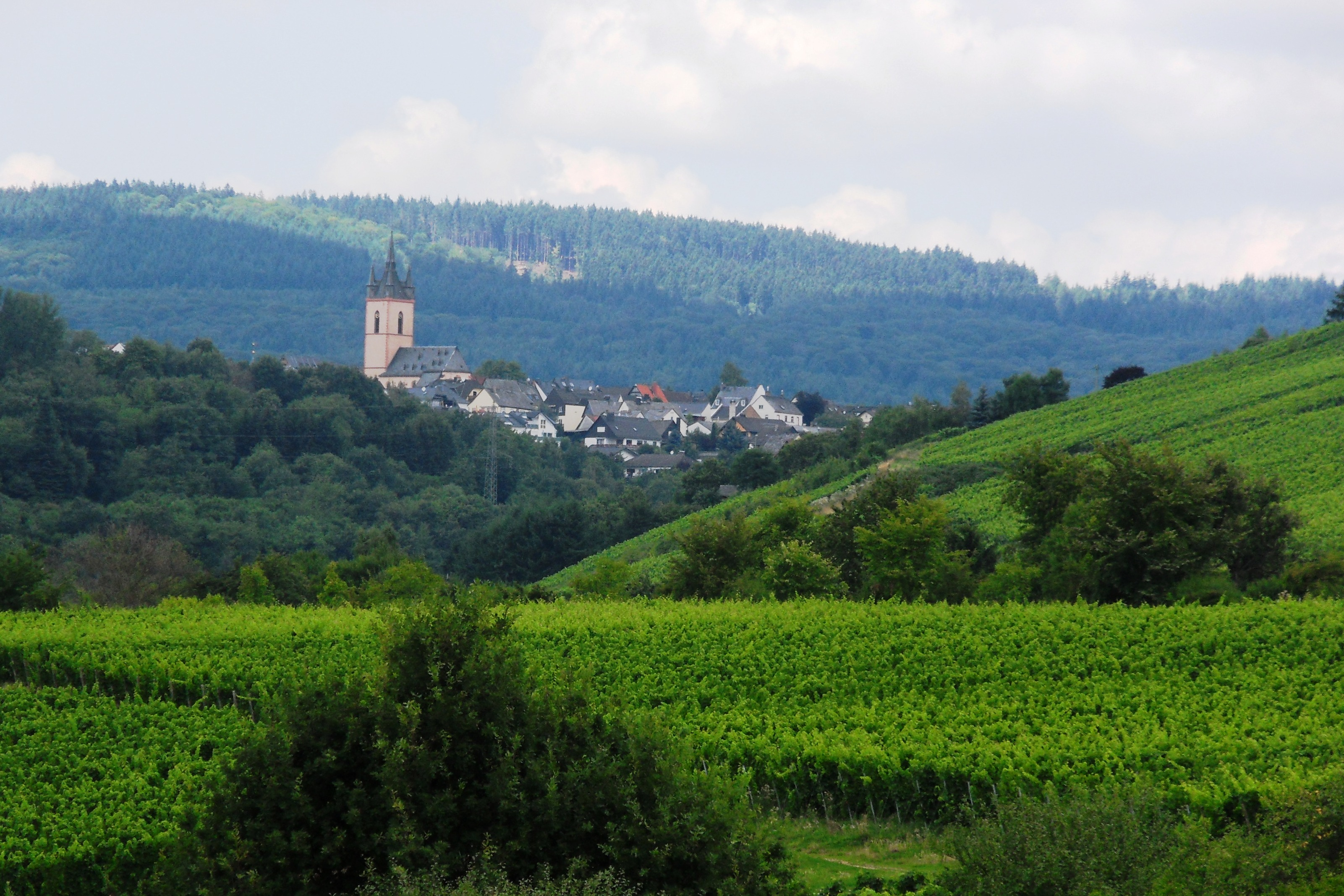
- From Walluftalbrücke of B 42 across vineyards, surrounded by Taunus mountains
- Interactive map of Rauenthal
- Location within Germany Location within Hesse
- Coordinates: 50°3′30″N 8°6′36″E
- Country: Germany
- State: Hesse
- Admin. region: Darmstadt
- District: Rheingau-Taunus-Kreis
- Town: Eltville

Area
  - Total: 7.27 km^{2} (2.81 sq mi)
- Elevation: 255 m (837 ft)
- Time zone: UTC+01:00 (CET)
  - Summer (DST): UTC+02:00 (CEST)
- Postal codes: 65345
- Dialling codes: 06123
- Vehicle registration: RÜD

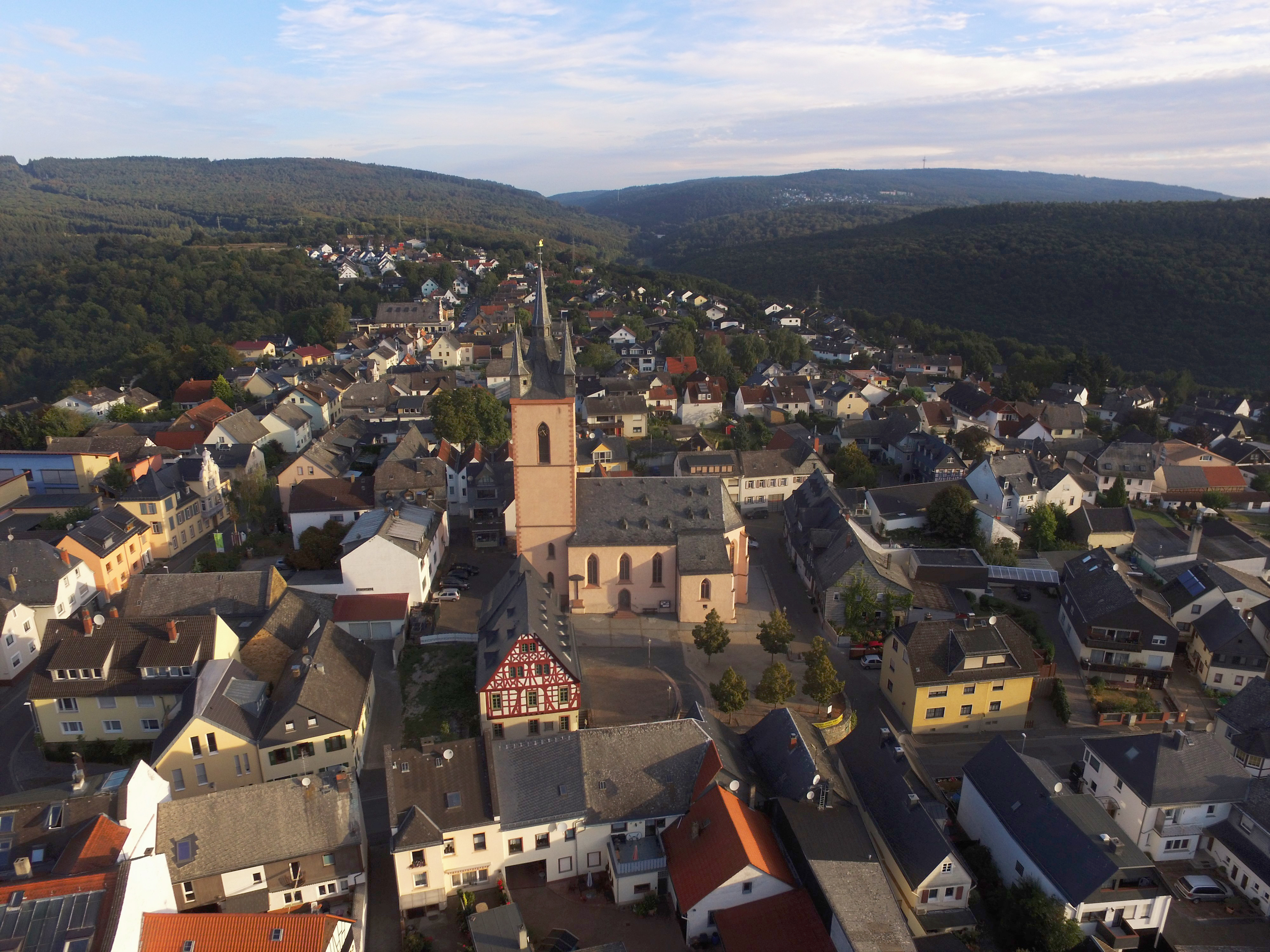
Areal view

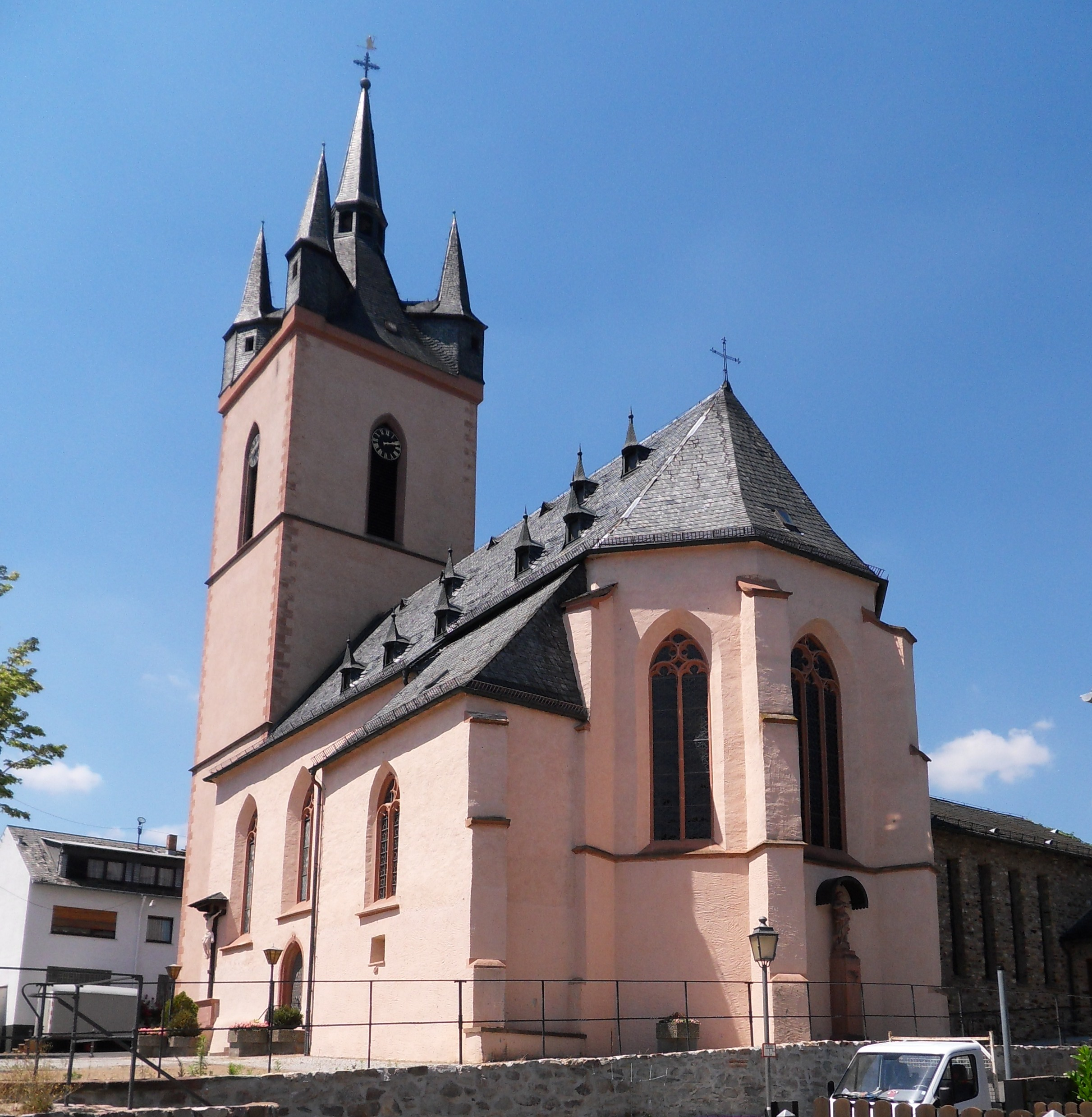
St. Antonius

Rauenthal is a town in the Rheingau, in the Rheingau-Taunus-Kreis, Hesse, Germany. It became part of Eltville in 1977, then officially named Rauenthal (Rheingau). It is known for growing wine.

== Geography ==
Rauenthal ist the highest Ortsteil of Eltville, in a saddle location on a mountain ridge, which runs from the Hansenkopf summit of the Taunus to the Bubenhäuser Höhe. To the east is a steep slope to the Walluftal, with Kloster Tiefenthal and up to Martinsthal. In the west is a steep slope to the Sülzbachtal. The Rauenthal vineyards are mostly southe of the Bubenhäuser Höhe, including the Domäne Rauenthal of the Hessische Staatsweingüter Kloster Eberbach.

== History ==
The bishops of Mainz promoted the cultivation of vineyards in the Rheingau region since the 8th century, first focused on the monasteries Eberbach Abbey and Johannisberg. Rauenthal was first documented on 23 March 1274, when Werner von Eppstein, archbishop of Mainz, wrote to the king, Rudolf von Habsburg, that he had brought the village into the Erzstift.

The most prominent building is the Gothic church of St. Antonius, built from 1468 to 1491. Christoph Nebel (1690–1769) was priest from 1714 to 1729, and later became auxiliary bishop in Mainz.

Wine from Rauenthal and its wine markets were famous in the 16th and 18th centuries, when the harvest was distributed by northern German and Dutch merchants, by boats on the Rhine or horse carriages. Nobility in Europe appreciated Rauenthal wine; it was named "best wine in the world" at the Pariser Weltausstellung im Jahr 1867.

In 1803 Rauenthal became part of Nassau-Usingen and belonged then to the Amt Eltville. After the annexion by the Prussians the town became part of the Rheingaukreis in the Regierungsbezirk Wiesbaden in 1867. In 1977, the Gebietsreform in Hessen, Rauenthal (Rheingau) became part of Eltville on 1 January 1977 together with other towns.

Rauenthal has several vineyards:

- Baiken
- Gehrn
- Langenstück
- Nonnenberg
- Rothenberg
- Wülfen

The name Rauenthaler Steinmächer is a major vineyard which may be sold from Rauenthal, Martinsthal, Eltville, Walluf, Kiedrich and Wiesbaden.

== People from Rauenthal ==
- Philipp Siegfried (1767–1845), farmer and member of the Nassau parliament
- Ingo Schon (born 1976), politician of the CDU and member of the Hessischer Landtag
