= Johannisberg (Geisenheim) =

Coordinates: 50°00′00″N 7°58′40″E

Johannisberg is a village to the west of Wiesbaden in Hessen, Germany. It is part of the city of Geisenheim in the Rheingau, on the right bank of the Rhine.

The place is mainly celebrated for the beautiful castle, Schloss Johannisberg, which crowns a hill overlooking the Rhine valley, and is surrounded by vineyards yielding the famous Johannisberger wine. The Schloss, built in 1757–1759 by the abbots of Fulda on the site of a Benedictine monastery founded in 1090, was bestowed, in 1808, by Napoleon upon Marshal Kellermann. In 1816 it was given by Francis I of Austria, to Prince Metternich, in recognition of his services as Austrian Foreign Minister.
