= Hallgarten =

Hallgarten is a surname. Notable people with the surname include:

- Charles Hallgarten (1838–1908), German-American banker, philanthropist and social reformer
- George W. F. Hallgarten (1901–1975), German-American historian
