= Böddiger Berg =

Vineyard in Hesse, Germany

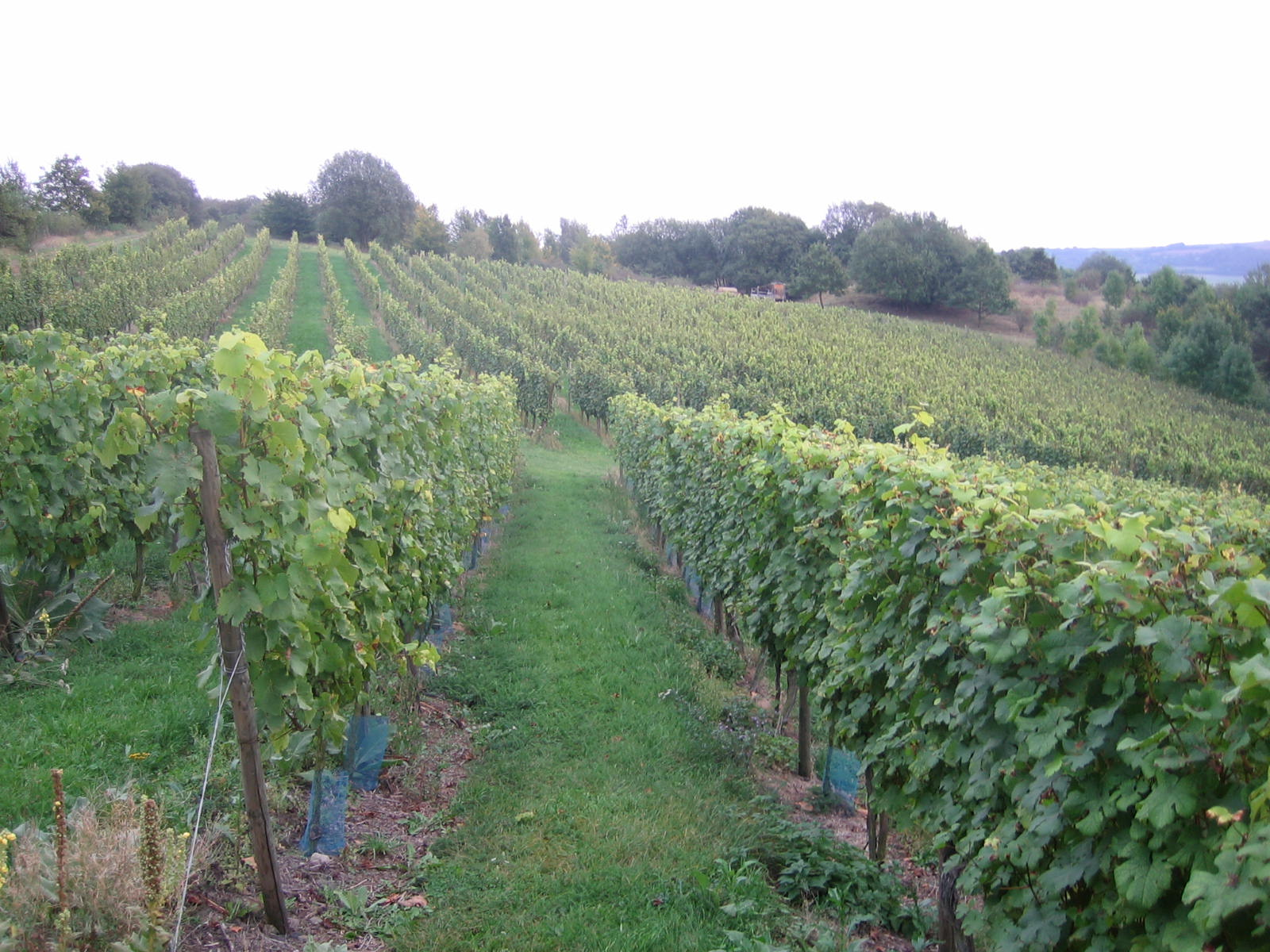
- vineyard Böddiger Berg

Highest point
- Elevation: 162 m (531 ft)
- Coordinates: 51°09′25″N 9°25′45″E

Geography
- Location: Schwalm-Eder-Kreis, Hesse, Germany

Böddiger Berg is a small vineyard next to the village of Böddiger, in the township of Felsberg, Schwalm-Eder-Kreis, Hesse, Germany. It is the northernmost vineyard in Hesse and was one of the first organic vineyards in Germany.

Vine was already grown in this region during medieval times, but at some point in the early modern era the production ceased. In the 1950s the entrepreneur Georg Angersbach revived wine production and laid the base for the current vineyard.

In the 1970s the vineyard became the subject of a legal battle, when state authorities tried to shut down the wine production in this region in favour of the better known wine regions in Southern Hesse. The authorities lost in court and wine production continued.

Financial difficulties and harvest loss due to harsh weather conditions led to an interruption of the production after Angersbach's death in 1979. The property was taken over by the state of Hesse, which used it as a therapy center for drug addiction. In 1992 a local society formed to continue the vine growing tradition. It rented parts of the original vineyard from the state and started to produce organic wine.

Since then the yearly harvest has varied between one and ten metric tonnes depending on weather and pest conditions, which translates to between 1,000 and 10,000 bottles of wine. In 2021, however, no harvest was possible.
