= Martinsthal =

- Ortsbezirk of Eltville
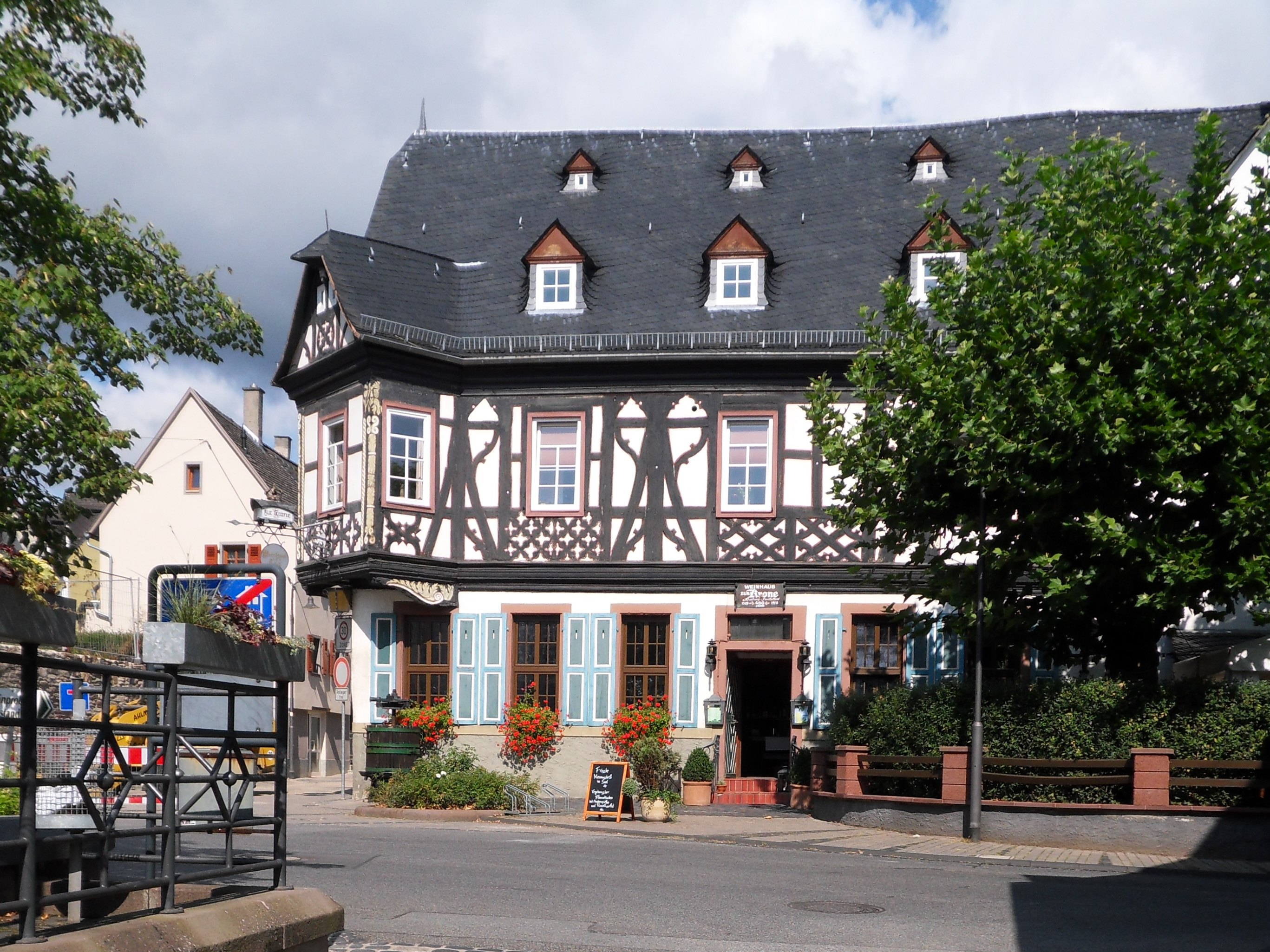
- Framework at Hotel zur Krone
- Interactive map of Martinsthal
- Location within Germany Location within Hesse
- Coordinates: 50°03′09″N 8°07′16″E
- Country: Germany
- State: Hesse
- Admin. region: Darmstadt
- District: Rheingau-Taunus-Kreis
- Town: Eltville

Area
  - Total: 4.73 km^{2} (1.83 sq mi)
- Elevation: 153 m (502 ft)
- Time zone: UTC+01:00 (CET)
  - Summer (DST): UTC+02:00 (CEST)
- Postal codes: 65344
- Dialling codes: 06123
- Vehicle registration: RÜD

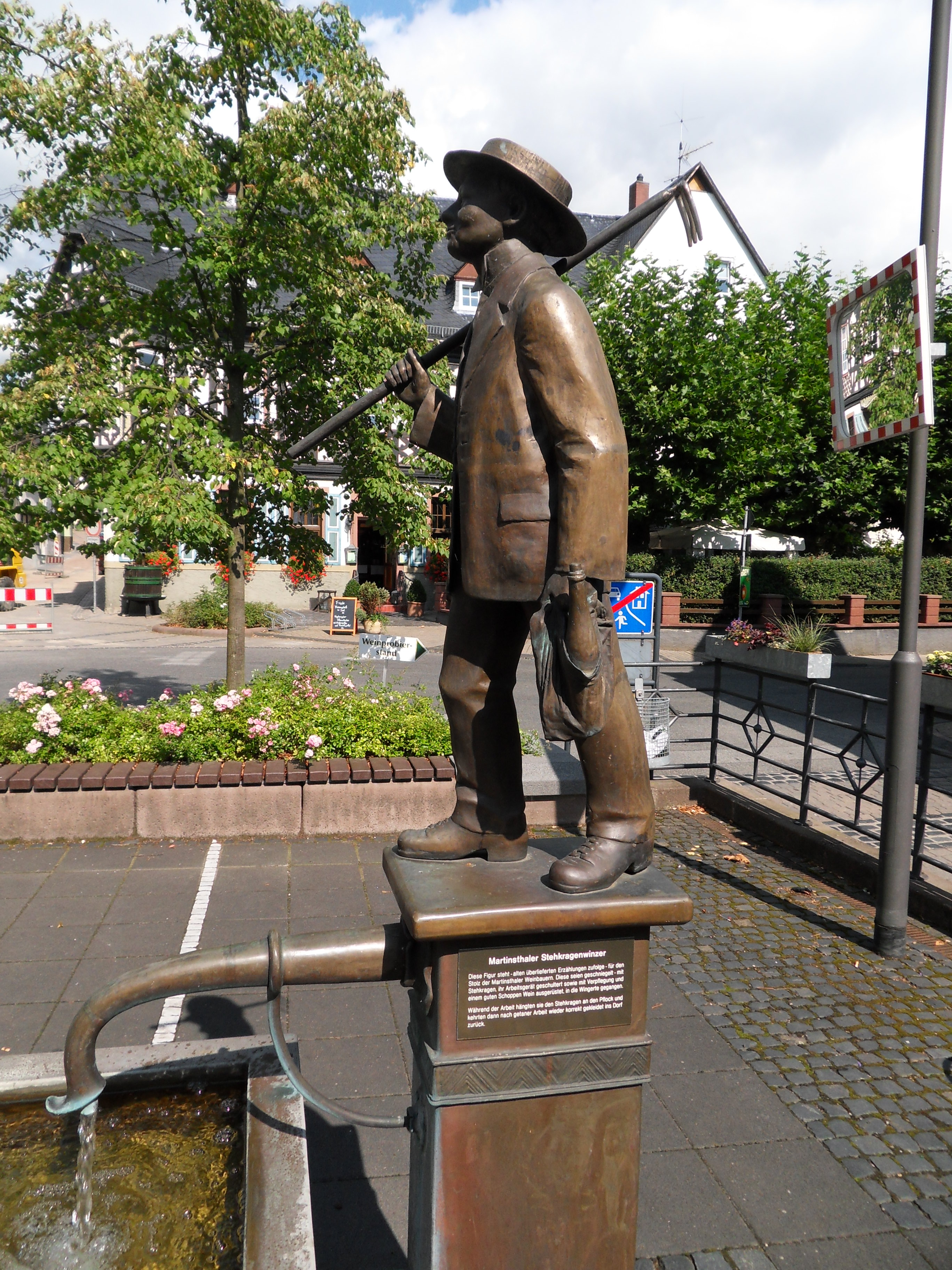
Winzerbrunnen

Martinsthal is a village in Rheingau-Taunus-Kreis, Hesse, Germany. It has been Ortsbezirk of Eltville am Rhein from 1 January 1977. Martinsthal is one of the well-known wine-growing locations in the Rheingau.

== History ==
The foundation of Martinsthal is connected to the installation of the Rheingauer Gebück divisions. The name was first Rode, where settlers set foot on an invitation from Gerlach von Nassau, bishop of Mainz in 1363 in the new protexted territory. They called their foundation Mertinsdal, but it became also known as Neudorf.

A priest is documented there since 1401. In 1429 the parish ad its own priest. The village belonged to the Oberamt Eltville from 1684. In 1803 the village came to Nassau-Usingen, then part of the Herzogtum Nassau. When is came under Prussian in 1867, the village became part of the Rheingaukreis in the Regierungsbezirk Wiesbaden.

With the Gebietsreform in Hessen, Martinsthal became, together with other villages, part of Eltville on 1 January 1977. It was governed by a Ortsbeirat presided by an Ortsvorsteher.

== Cultural monuments ==
- The old parish church St. Sebastian und Laurentius dates from the beginning of the 15th century.

== People ==
- Nikolaus Kindlinger (1749 in Neudorf – 1819 in Mainz), scientist in the field of archives und German Landesgeschichte
- Nikolaus Kindlinger (5 November 1782 – 20 March 1847), farmer and member of the Nassau parliament
- Franz Weißenberger (born 3 March 1938 in Mainz-Kastel – 26 May 2014), last mayor and honorary citizen of Martinsthal
- Mathilde Weber (13 Ma< 1933 – 13 July 2016), first Martinsthal wine queen and first Rheingau wine queen from Martinsthal
- Ulrike Neradt (born 1951 as Ulrike Seyffardt), TV moderator, singer and dialect poet
