= Schloss Johannisberg =

Castle and winery in Hesse, Germany

Coordinates: 50°00′00″N 7°59′02″E

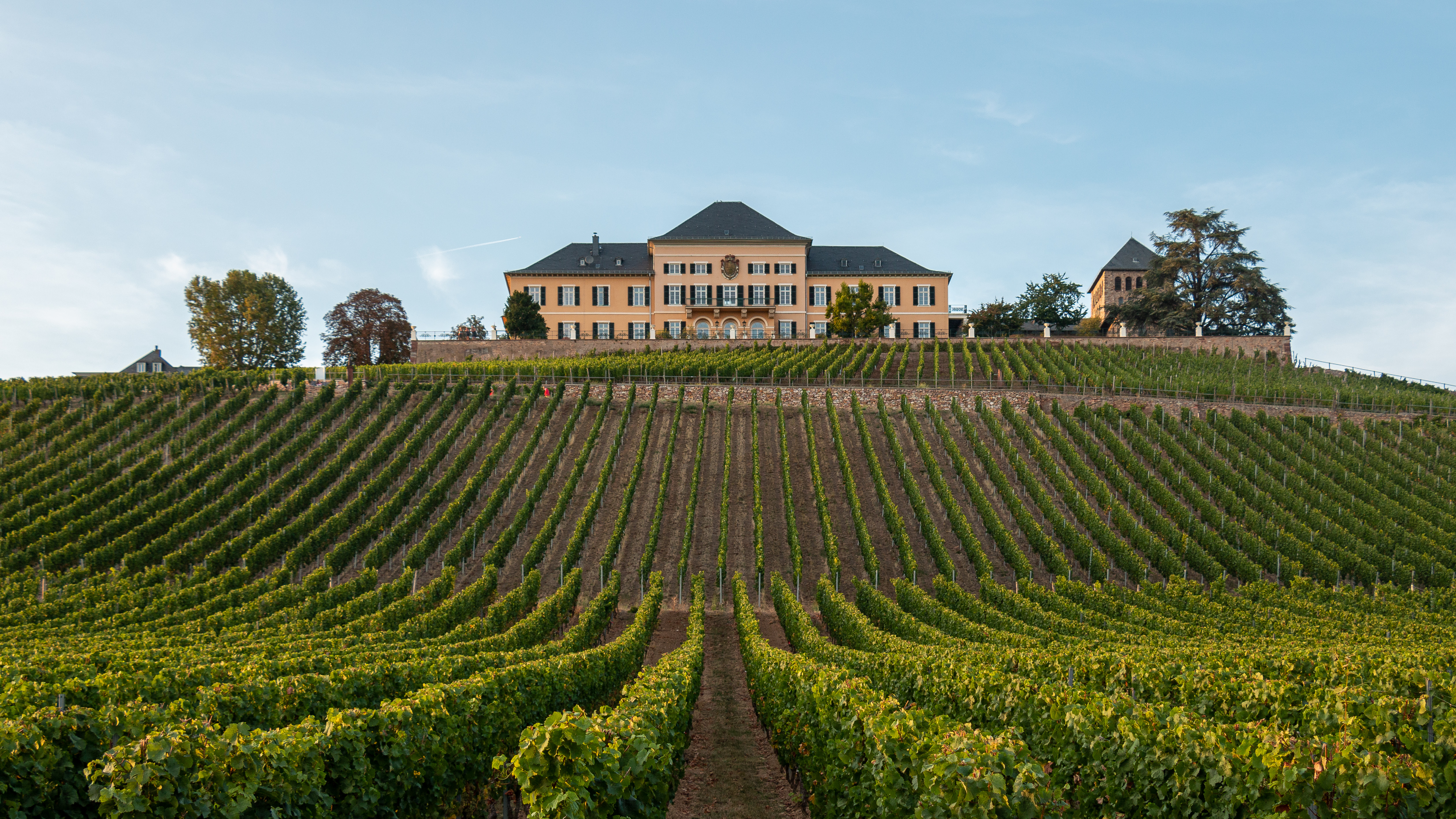
- Schloss Johannisberg within its vineyards
- Location: Johannisberg (Geisenheim), Hesse, Germany
- Founded: 1100: 919 years ago
- Parent company: Dr. Oetker
- Known for: Schloss Johannisberg Riesling
- Varietal: Riesling
- Distribution: international
- Tasting: open to the public
- Website: www.schloss-johannisberg.com

Schloss Johannisberg (Hesse)

Schloss Johannisberg (German pronunciation: [ˈʃlɔs joˈhanɪsbɛʁk]) is a neoclassical palace and historic winery located in the village of Johannisberg, west of Wiesbaden in Hesse, within the Rheingau wine region of Germany. Originally founded as a Benedictine monastery, the estate was transformed into a Baroque palace and winery in the early 18th century under the ownership of the Prince-Abbots of Fulda.

In the early 19th century, the estate came into the ownership of Austrian diplomat Prince Klemens Wenzel von Metternich. It was bestowed upon him by Emperor Francis I in recognition of his role at the Congress of Vienna. The Metternich family owned and managed the estate’s winemaking for over 150 years.

Schloss Johannisberg considers itself the oldest Riesling vineyard in the world with a wine-making history over 900 years. The 50-hectare vineyard is known for its late-harvest wines (Spätlese) and ice wine (Eiswein).

The palace also serves as a cultural venue. It is a prominent location for the Rheingau Musik Festival, a role made possible by co-founder princess Tatiana von Metternich-Winneburg, who ensured the estate's continued contribution to the arts.

== History ==
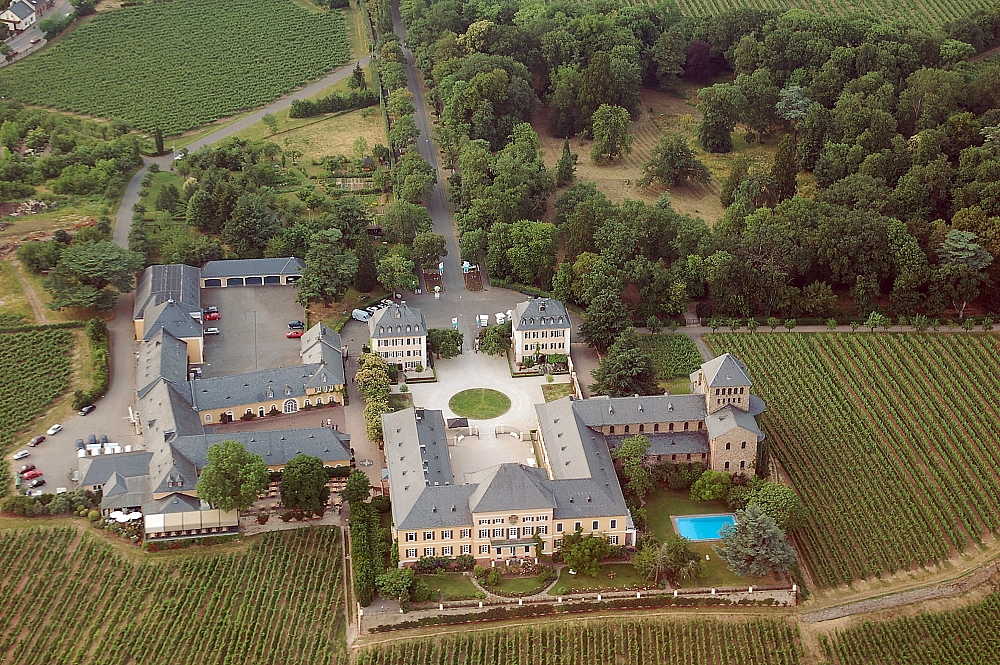
Aerial photo, 2006

=== Beginnings and monastic winery ===
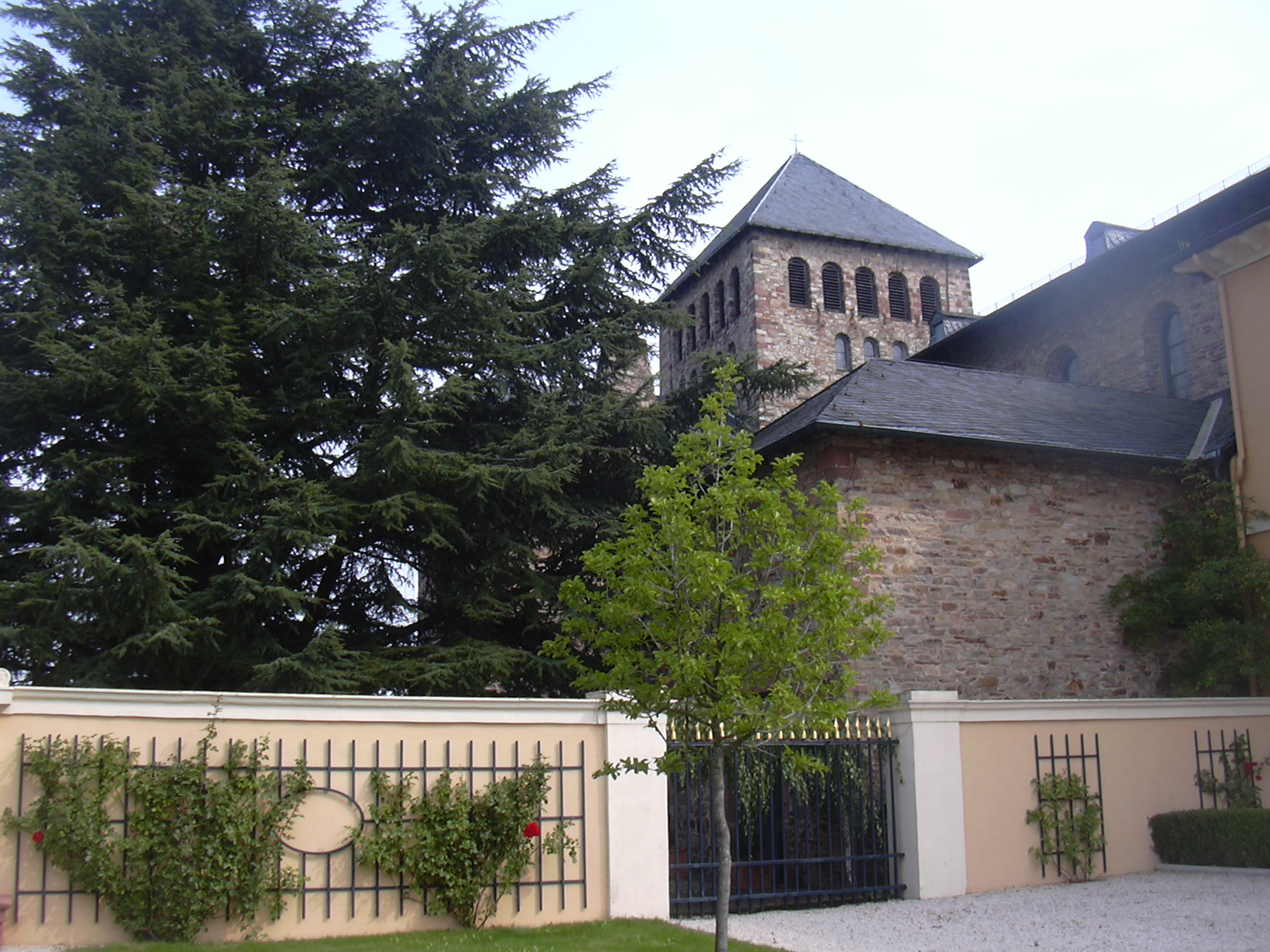
Basilika St. Johannes

According to legend, the establishment of a vineyard on a mountain along the northern bank of the Rhine near Mainz dates back to the time of Charlemagne. From his palace in Ingelheim, Charlemagne is said to have observed that snow on Johannisberg melted earlier than on surrounding hills as spring arrived, inspiring the cultivation of vines on its slopes.

The earliest documented history of the area dates to 772, when lands in Geisenheim were donated to the Abbey of Fulda. In 817, the monks exchanged these holdings with Louis the Pious for lands in the Wetterau region. The contract explicitly mentioned the parcel's location along the Elsterbach stream, which runs at the foot of Johannisberg. By 983, Emperor Otto II had granted sovereignty over the western Rheingau to the Archbishops of Mainz, although the vineyard was already known by then as "Bischofsberg" ("Bishop's Mountain").

Around 1100, Archbishop Ruthard gifted the vineyard to the Benedictine monastery of St. Alban in Mainz. The monks were tasked with establishing a new monastic community on the site, which they dedicated to Saint John (Johannes). This foundation, and its subsequent naming, were associated with the tragic Rhineland massacres of 1096 (known in Hebrew as Gzerot Tatnó), which took place during the First Crusade on 27 May, the feast day of Pope John I. The monastery's establishment was regarded as an act of atonement by Archbishop Ruthard and his brother-in-law, Count Richolf of Rheingau, even from a Jewish perspective.

By the mid-12th century, the estate was first referred to as "Sankt Johannisberg" ("Saint John's Mountain"). Until 1130, Johannisberg functioned as a priory of St. Alban's Abbey. It was subsequently elevated to the status of an independent abbey by Adalbert of Saarbrücken. Around this time, a grand three-nave pillar basilica with nine bays and a prominent transept was constructed on the site, of which only its foundations remain today.

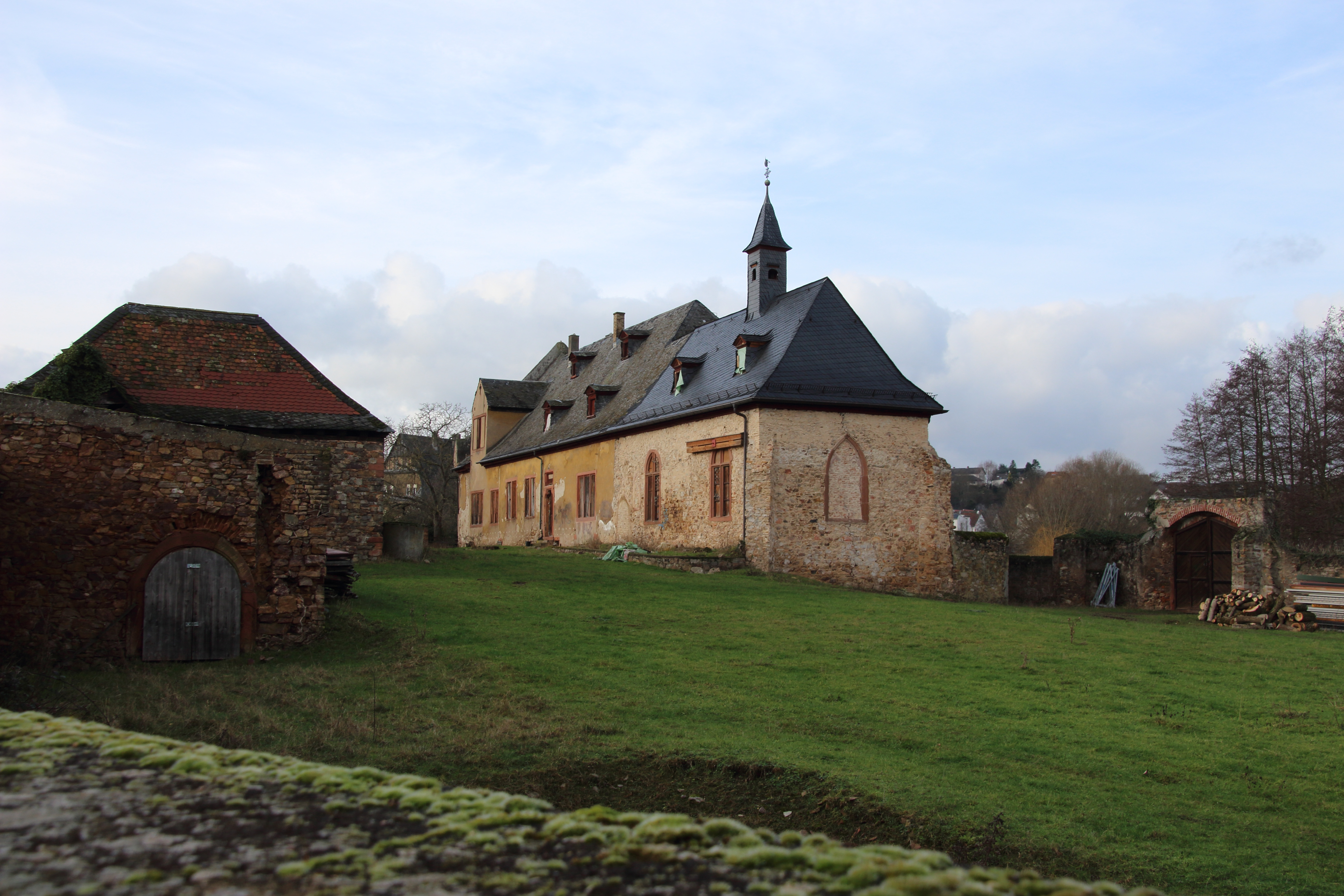
Johannisberger Klaus

For a time, the monastery at Johannisberg even oversaw a priory that would later develop into the Eberbach Abbey. In its early years, Kloster Johannisberg operated as a double monastery, with an adjoining women's hermitage. One such hermitage, the Saint George's Hermitage (German: Sankt-Georgsklause), was located at the foot of the mountain. First mentioned around 1170, it existed until 1452 and later lent its name to the present-day wine estate "Johannisberger Klaus".

=== Decline of the monastery ===
After an initial period of prosperity, the monastery experienced a gradual decline. In 1451, Cardinal Nicholas of Cusa lamented that "the monastery has decayed both internally and externally" due to "the disorderly lifestyle of the monks." However, the monks expressed a willingness to reform, on the condition that the hermitage and its associated estates be assigned to them to secure their livelihood. This request was granted, and in 1457, the convent joined the reform-oriented Bursfelde Congregation, ushering in a new period of revival.

The German Peasants' War of 1524/25 marked the beginning of the monastery's final decline, and the raid by Margrave Albert Alcibiades of Brandenburg-Kulmbach during the Margrave's War in 1552 ultimately ruined it. When the last abbot died in 1563, Archbishop Daniel Brendel von Homburg of Mainz decreed the dissolution of the monastery, and its properties were placed under secular administration.

In 1635, during the Thirty Years' War, Archbishop Anselm Casimir of Mainz was forced to pawn Johannisberg to cover the costs of the Swedish occupation of the Rheingau. Imperial Treasurer Hubert von Bleymann received all wine revenues as interest on a loan of 20,000 Reichsthaler he had provided. The debt was increased by 10,000 Reichsthaler in 1641, and the contract was later transferred to the creditor's descendants, Georg von Gise and his son Johann Heinrich. However, by the early 18th century, the family appears to have lost interest in Johannisberg. During the Thirty Years’ War and the period of the pawning, the monastic church suffered great damage.

=== The Prince-Abbots of Fulda ===
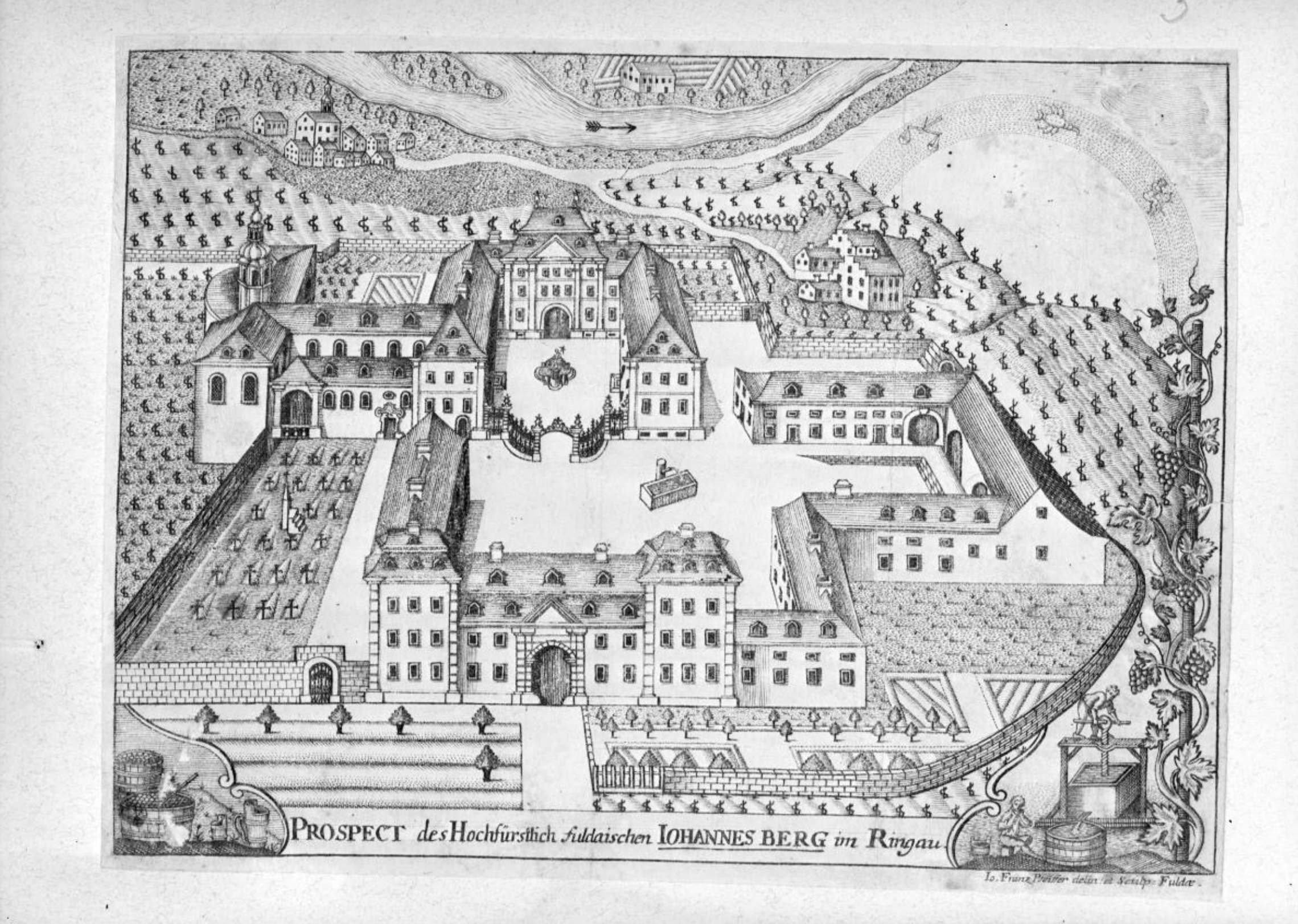
View of Schloss Johannisberg in the times of the Prince-abbots of Fulda

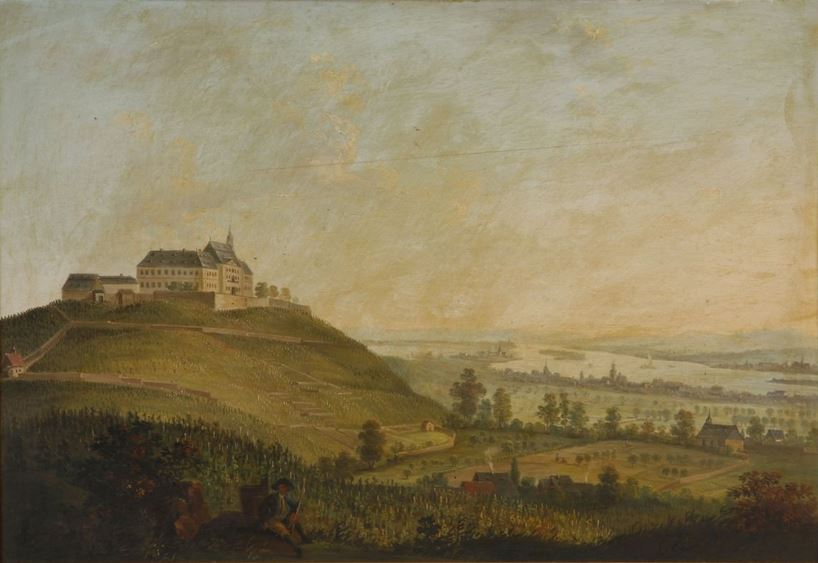
The prince-abbots created the first Riesling vineyard in the world in Johannisberg in 1720

In 1716, Archbishop Lothar Franz von Schönborn sold Johannisberg to the Prince-Abbot of Fulda, Konstantin von Buttlar, who spent a total of 75,392 gulden on the acquisition. He expanded the estate into his summer residence for an additional 148,000 gulden.

The dilapidated monaster buildings were demolished and the leading Mainz architects, Andrea Gallasini and Johann Kaspar Herwarthel, constructed a three-winged Baroque palace with a courtyard located to the north. Of this building, the two outer pavilions and the courtyard gate remain unchanged today. Within the palace grounds, the pressing house was given a central position. The Romanesque church was rebuilt and its interior was redesigned in a baroque style according to the plans of Johann Dientzenhofer.

In 1721, the impressive 260-meter-long vaulted cellar was completed. Significant investments were also made in the vineyards. The vineyard area grew from 14.3 to 18.9 hectares, with half of it newly planted. Almost exclusively Riesling was planted, with only a small portion reserved for the Orléans (grape) — then still dominant, for example, in the Rüdesheim hills — and Muscat (grape). For this reason, Schloss Johannisberg still considers itself the oldest Riesling vineyard in the world. The planting density at that time was significantly higher than today; in 1720 and 1721 alone, 293,950 vines were planted, which corresponds to at least 30,000 vines per hectare. By the second half of the 18th century, larger quantities of Johannisberger wine were being bottled—usually after ten years of barrel aging. Bottling took place in the cellar of the orangery at Fulda's city palace. This cellar, where the finest Johannisberger wines were stored, was overseen by the "secret cabinet," the private treasury of the Prince-Abbot or Prince-Bishop (from 1762 onward).

These "cabinet" wines were, by today's standards, selections of late-harvest or botrytized (noble rot) grapes, systematically produced by the Johannisberg estate starting in the last quarter of the 18th century. This tradition almost certainly began in 1775. That year, the courier responsible for delivering a sample of Johannisberg grapes to Fulda to obtain harvest permission was delayed by eight days. In the meantime, the grapes had been affected by Noble rot; nevertheless, wine was pressed from them. On 10 April 1776, administrator Johann Michael Engert remarked that he had never experienced such an excellent flavor. From that point forward, harvests were postponed as long as possible. The first wine officially labeled as a "cabinet" selection Auslese was likely produced at Schloss Johannisberg in 1779, with the first Ice wine following in 1858.

A monument in the courtyard of Schloss Johannisberg commemorates the "Spätlesereiter" (late-harvest rider). However, these were not the first wines made from noble rot-affected grapes. Such wines are documented as early as the 16th century, and in 1757 a "delicate wine" made from botrytized grapes was also pressed at Schloss Johannisberg.

The estate changed hands several times during the Napoleonic Wars: after the expropriation caused by the secularization in 1802, it became property of prince William V of Orange, the last Stadtholder of the Dutch Republic, who gave it to his son, hereditary prince William, who later became the first king of the Netherlands. But in 1806, he was expropriated as he refused to join the Confederation of the Rhine, and Napoleon granted the vineyard and palace to Marshal Kellermann, the first duke of Valmy.

When the excellent year of 1807 was followed by several poor vintages, the then-manager Adelaide Marco felt compelled to sell the 1811 vintage to the banker Peter Arnold Mumm from Frankfurt. This so-called "comet vintage" became the best of the entire century. Mumm, who had invested only 32,000 guilders in it, received over 150,000 guilders and was able to use the profit to establish his own winery in Johannisberg.

At the Congress of Vienna in 1814, it was decided that Johannisberg became Austrian, although the Rheingau became part of the Duchy of Nassau.

=== The Princes of Metternich ===
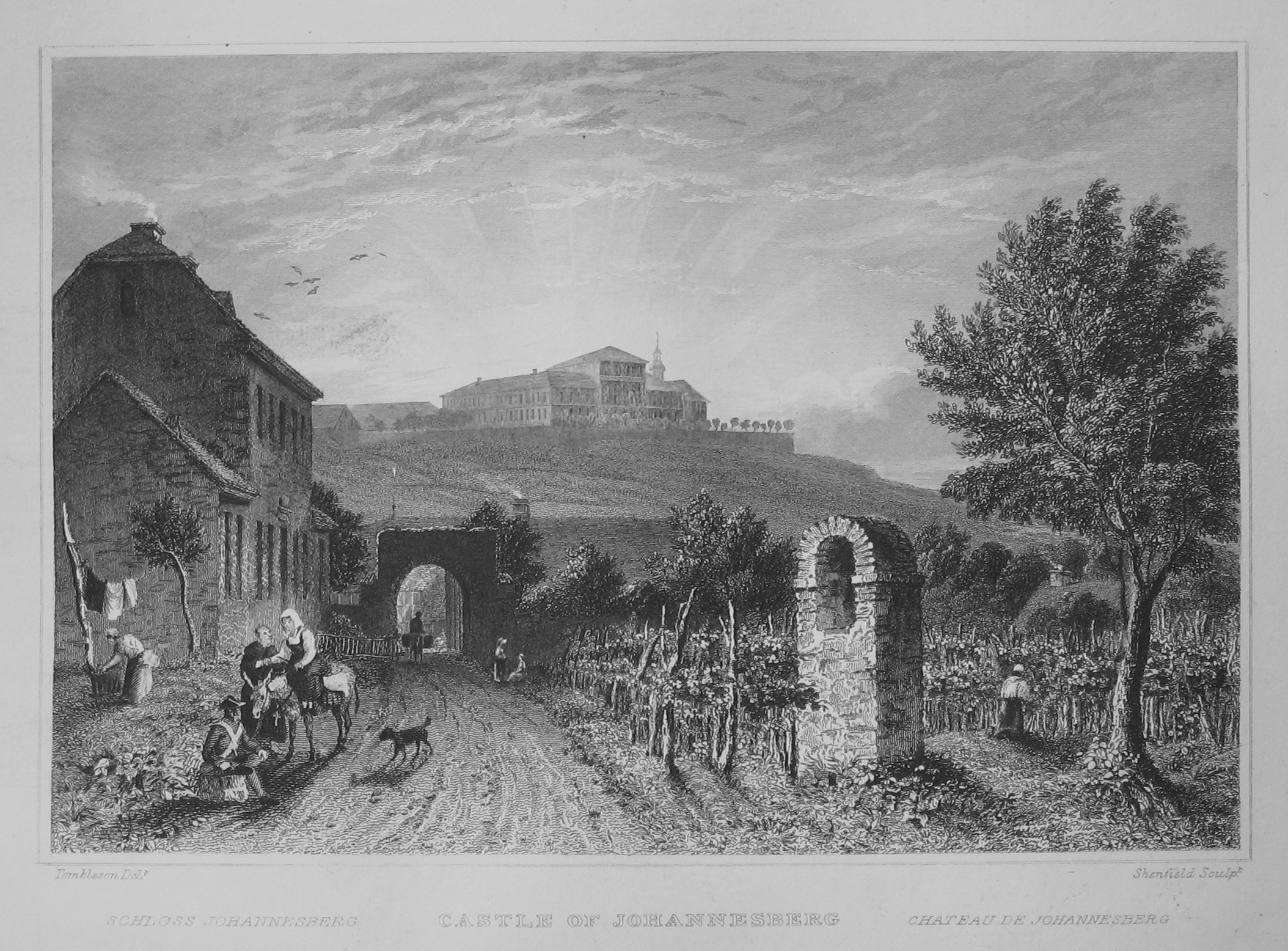
Schloss Johannisberg around 1832, engraving by William Tombleson

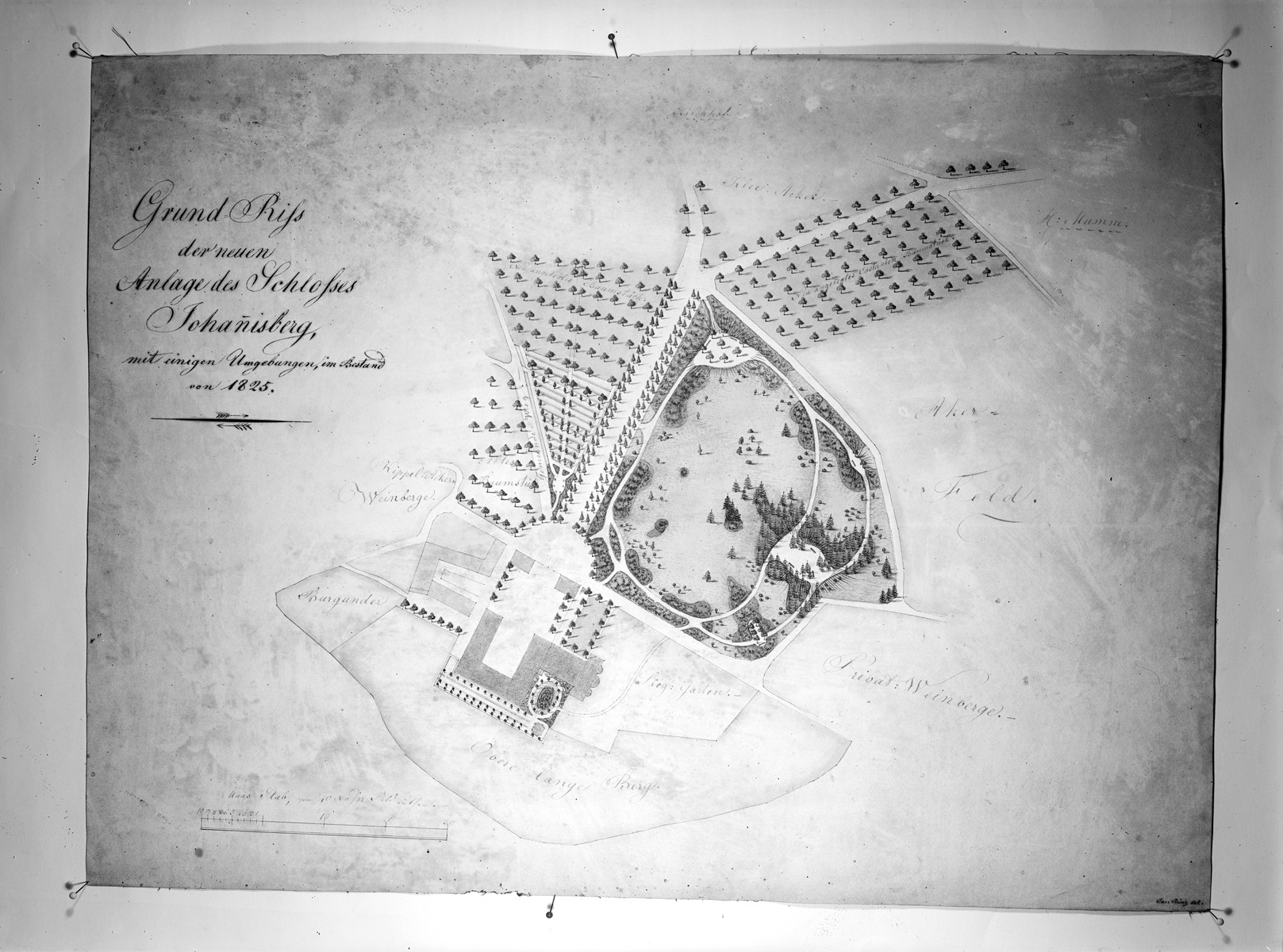
Plan of Johannisberg with the English landscape garden laid out under Prince Metternich

In 1816 the Austrian emperor Francis I, granted it to the Austrian Chancellor Klemens von Metternich, Prince von Metternich in exchange for an annual payment of one-tenth of the yield from the vineyards that were over twelve years old to the House of Habsburg. This tithe has survived all political upheavals to this day. Since 1945, it has been paid in cash, whereas previously, the barrels were allocated by lot. The current tithe beneficiary is Karl von Habsburg-Lothringen. Originally, the estate was intended to revert to the Habsburg family as a fideicommis upon the extinction of the princely Metternich-Winneburg line. However, this arrangement was abolished with the end of noble privileges in 1920. Austria only renounced its political sovereignty claims over Johannisberg in 1851, which resulted in back taxes being paid to the Nassau state treasury.

In 1826, the Prince of Metternich remodeled the main building of Schloss Johannisberg in a neoclassical style with help of Georg Moller, court architect of the Grand Duchy of Hesse. The reconstruction created a striking contrast: the earlier Baroque design emphasized verticality, whereas the later Neoclassical style shifted the focus to horizontal elements. Furthermore, prince Metternich had a park designed in the English style. Initially, the Frankfurt city gardener Sebastian Rinz was enlisted for this purpose; later plans were carried out by Heinrich Siesmayer, the creator of the Frankfurt botanical Palmengarten. Note that Schloss Johannisberg was not the main country seat of the princes of Metternich, as this were Kynžvart Castle and Plasy monastery in Bohemia.

==== Designs by Georg Moller ====
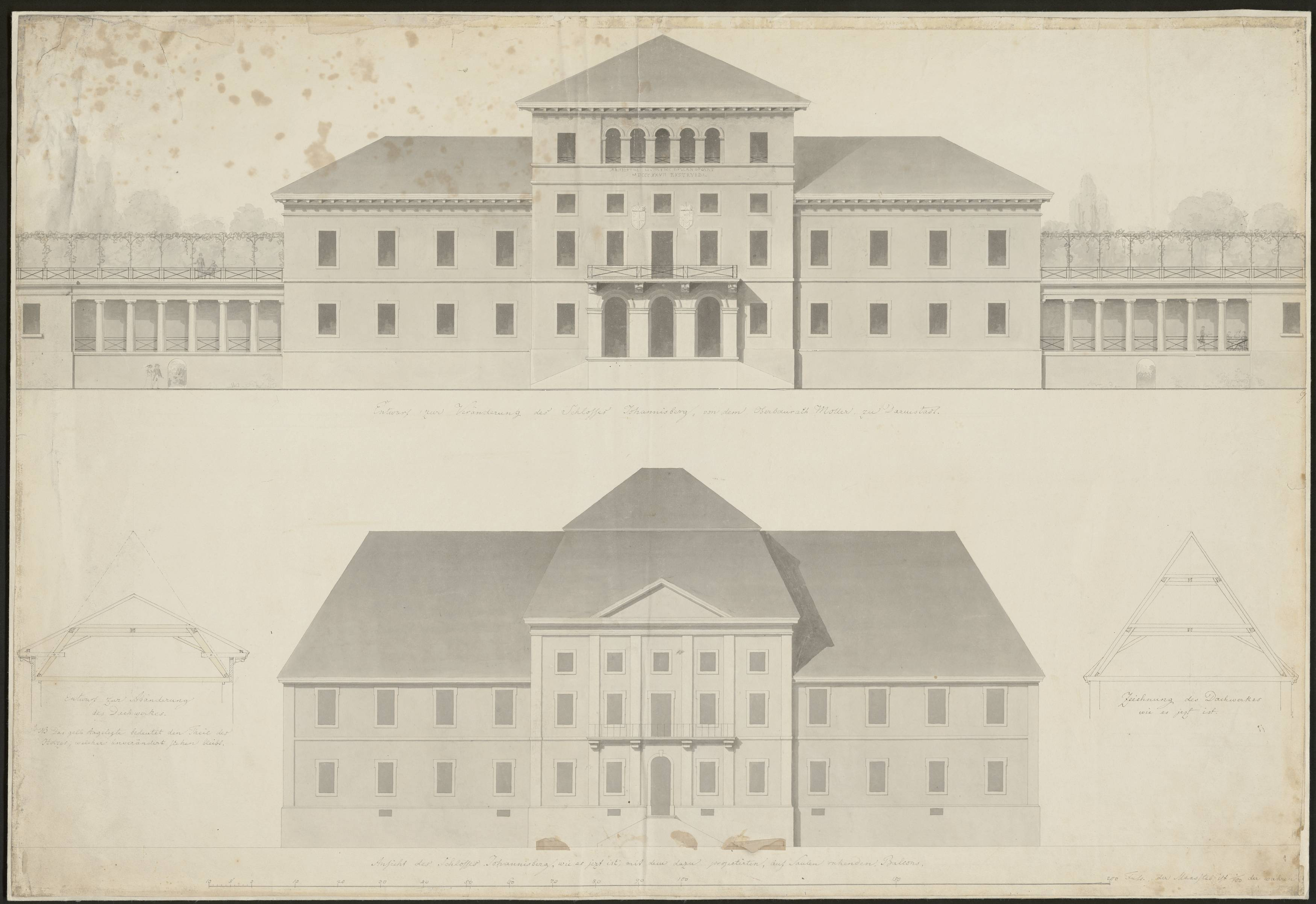
Before and after Georg Moller's neoclassical reconstruction: shifting from verticality to horizontality

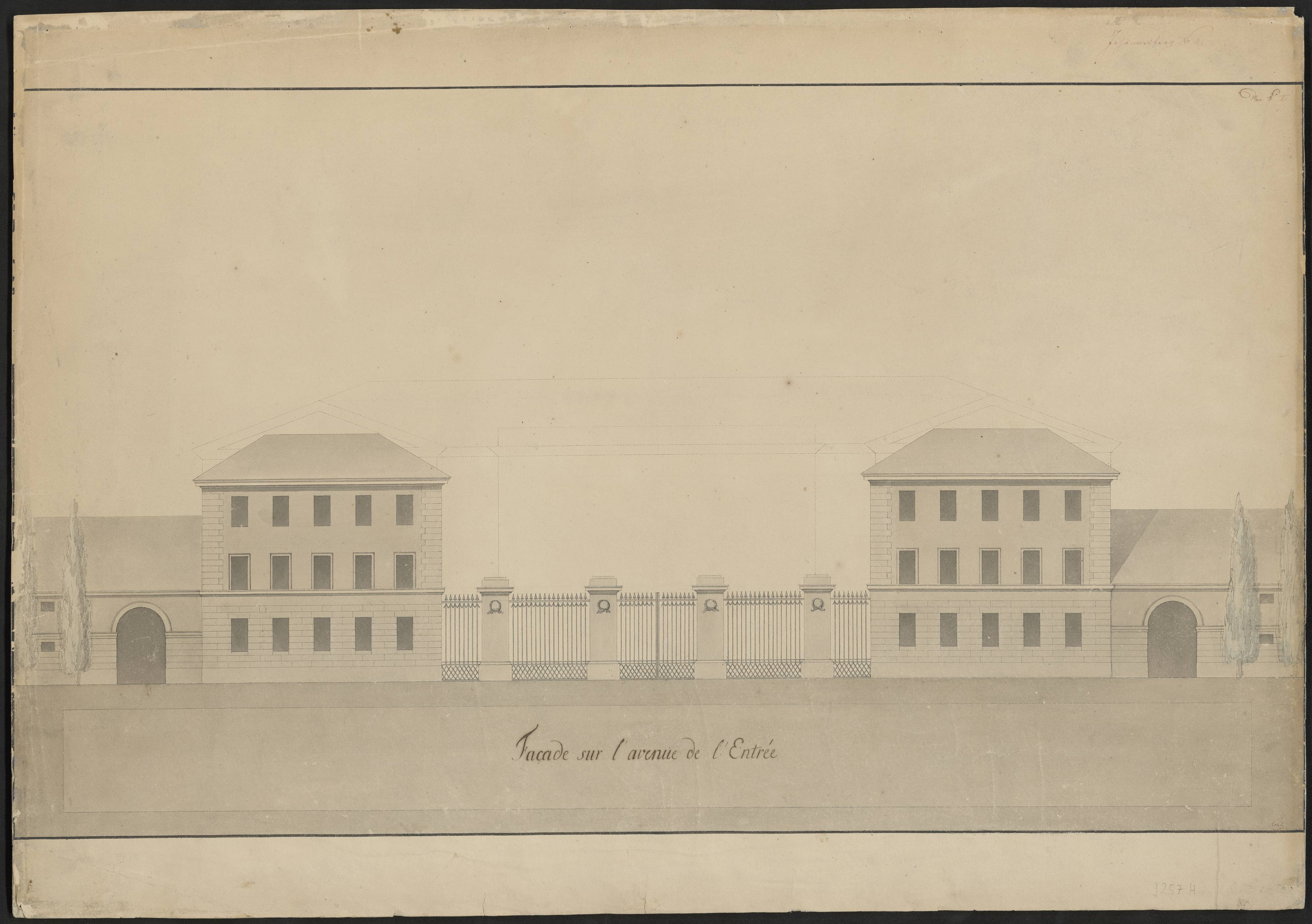
The neoclassical entrance to the courtyard

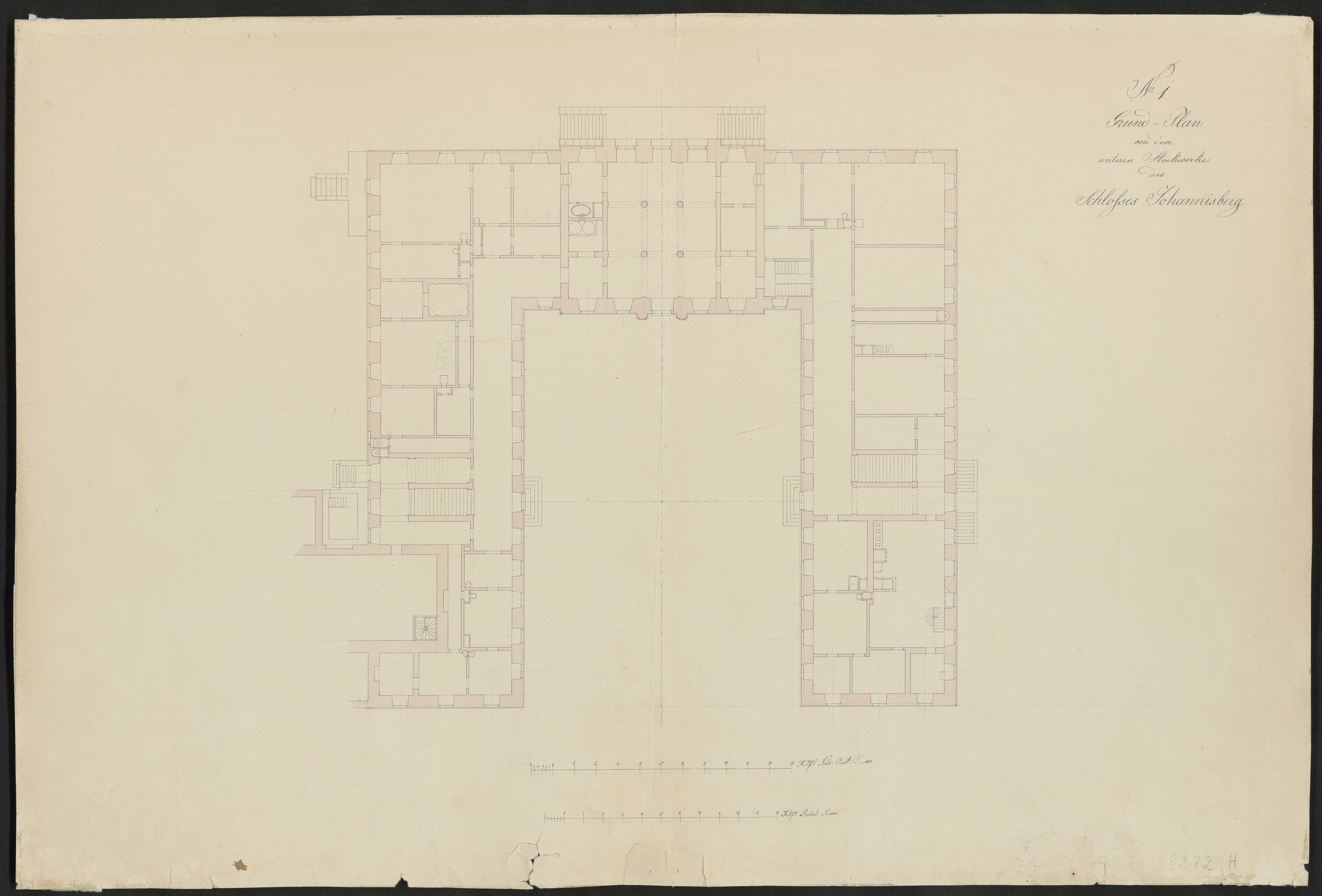
Ground floor plan (facing south) - The east wing on the left has been rebuilt as a large hall after the Second World War

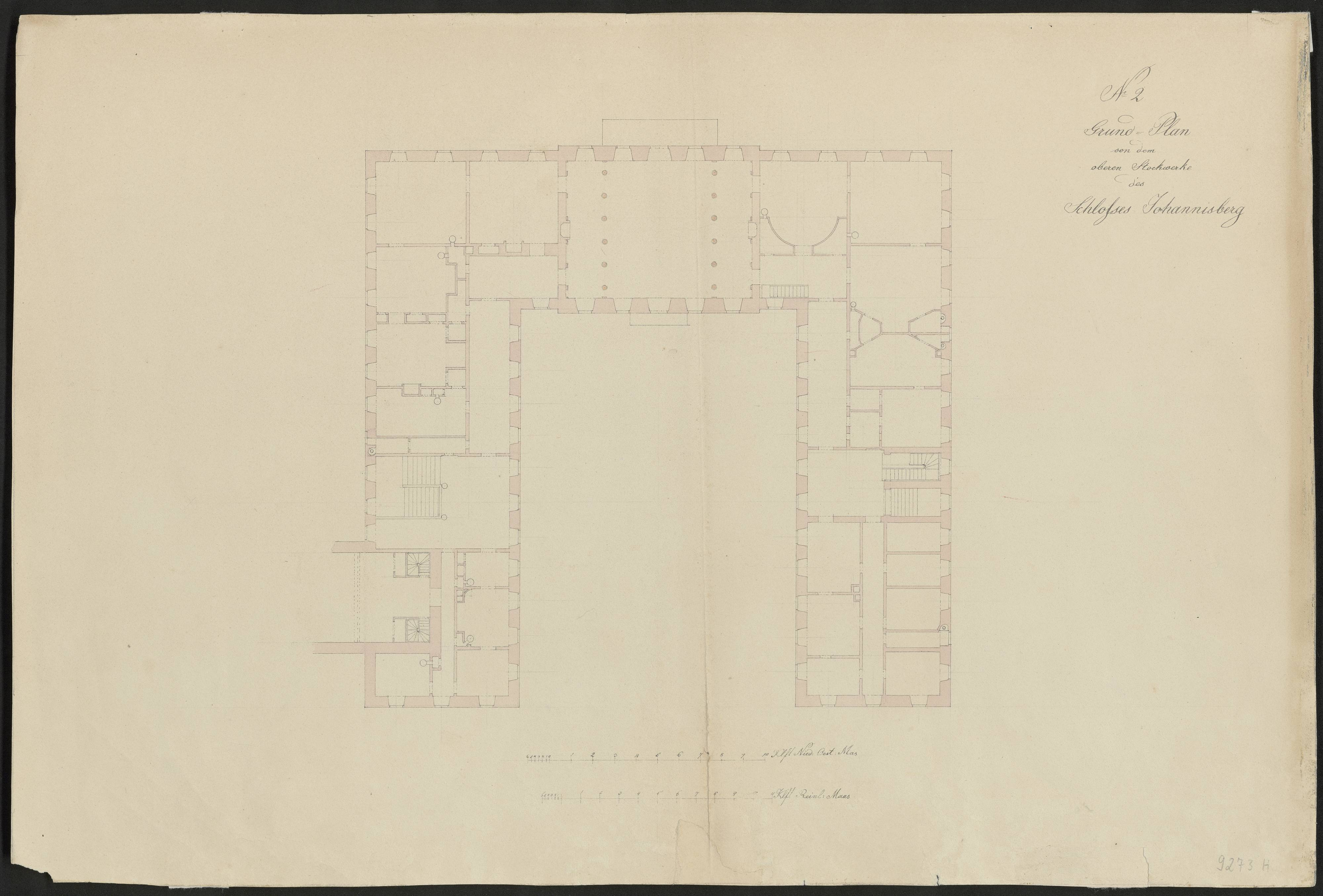
First floor plan (facing south) - In the middle of the main wing is the Hall of Mirrors (Spiegelsaal)

In the first half of the 19th century, Johannisberg became a destination for the emerging Rhine tourism; visitors enjoyed the famous wine right on the castle terrace. Even today, the wine bar remains in this location, surrounded by vine-covered pergolas, espaliered fig trees, and a chestnut-lined avenue. The German artist Carl Hemerlein from Mainz created a book of watercolor drawings depicting Schloss Johannisberg, which he prepared for Prince Metternich. This work is now in the Metternich collections at Kynžvart.

==== Johannisberg Drawings by Carl Hemerlein ====
The library in Kynzvart Castle has a map with watercolor drawings by Carl Hemerlein from the 1840s. Professor Wolfram Siemann of LMU Munich published about these drawings in his biography on Prince Metternich.

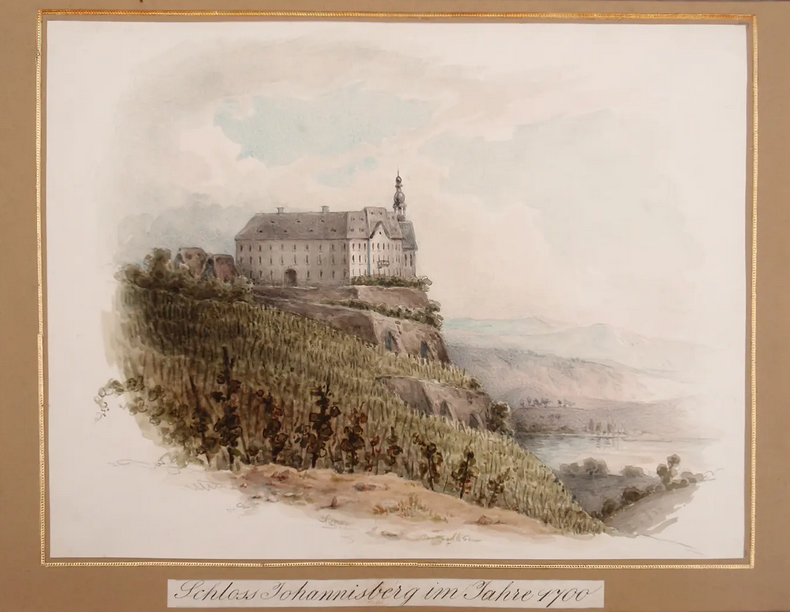
Baroque palace, 18th century

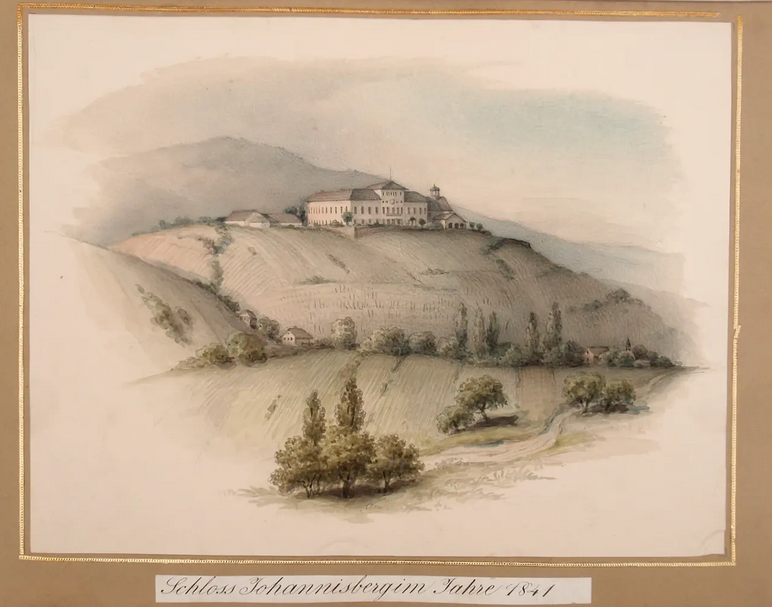
Neoclassical reconstruction

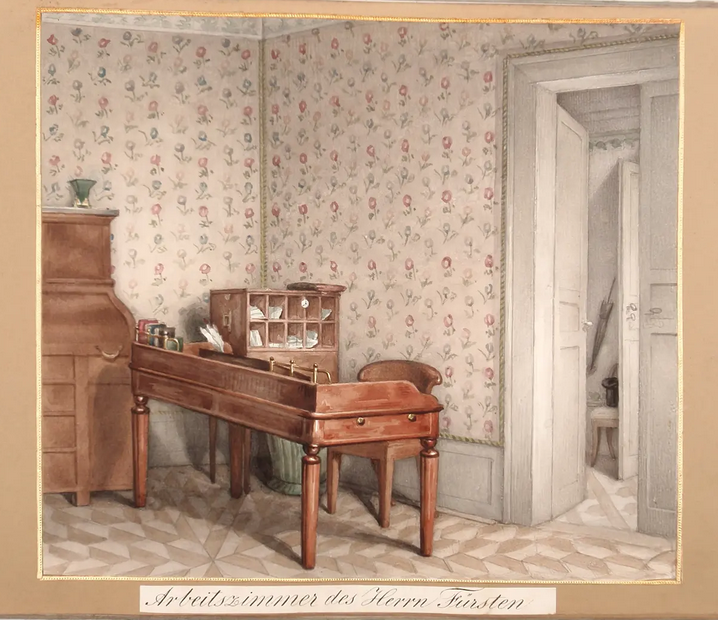
Study of Prince Metternich

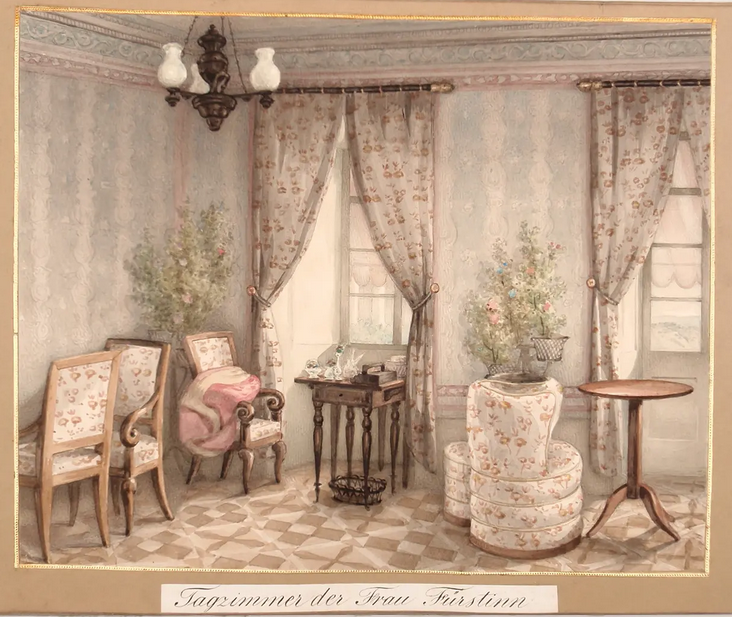
Drawing room of Princess Metternich

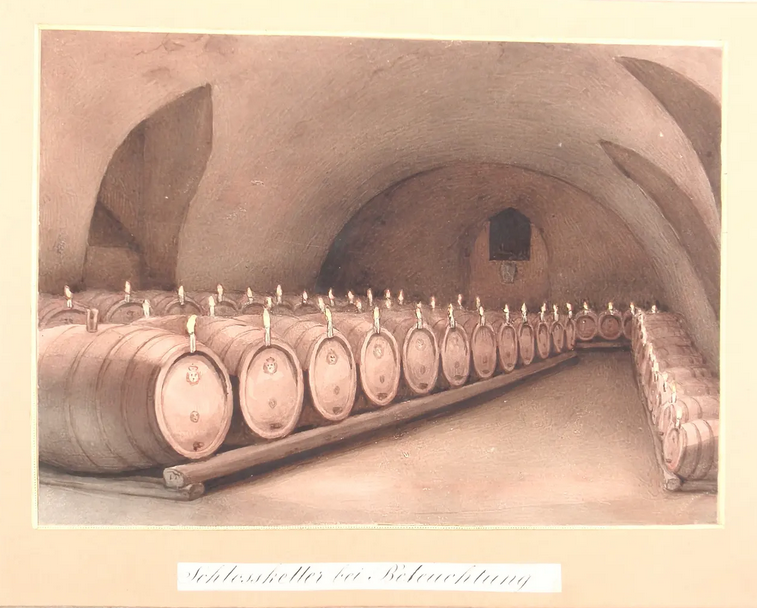
Wine cellar

Prince Metternich primarily resided in Vienna or on his Bohemian estates, spending only a few weeks each year at Johannisberg. This pattern continued with his successors, who also spent several weeks annually at the palace. The first successor was Klemens’ eldest son, the 3rd Prince, Richard von Metternich (1829–1895). As Richard only had daughters, the title passed to his half-brother, the 4rd Prince, Paul von Metternich (1834–1906), who was then succeeded by his son, the 5th Prince, Dr. Clemens Wenzel von Metternich (1869–1930).

The Metternich princes took a keen interest in managing the vineyard, aiming to enhance the quality and reputation of its bottled wines. Their efforts paid off, as Schloss Johannisberg's Riesling wines gained an outstanding reputation in the 19th century, becoming some of the most expensive wines in the world—often rivaling or surpassing the prices of their Bordeaux competitors. Additionally, the wines won numerous medals at international wine competitions in Paris, Philadelphia, and Vienna.

In December 1918, shortly after the end of the First World War, a misunderstanding arose following a demand from the occupying forces to surrender weapons. As a result, highly valuable, mostly oriental weapons from the 13th and 14th centuries—gifts from foreign rulers and part of the State Chancellor's collection—were handed over in a chest reinforced with iron bands. However, when all confiscated weapons were released on 18 August 1919, these items were no longer found. On 17 February 1923, the Weimar Republic assessed the compensation value for the lost weapons at 300,000 marks, although this amount was in the context of hyperinflation.

==== Paul Alfons and Tatiana von Metternich-Winneburg ====
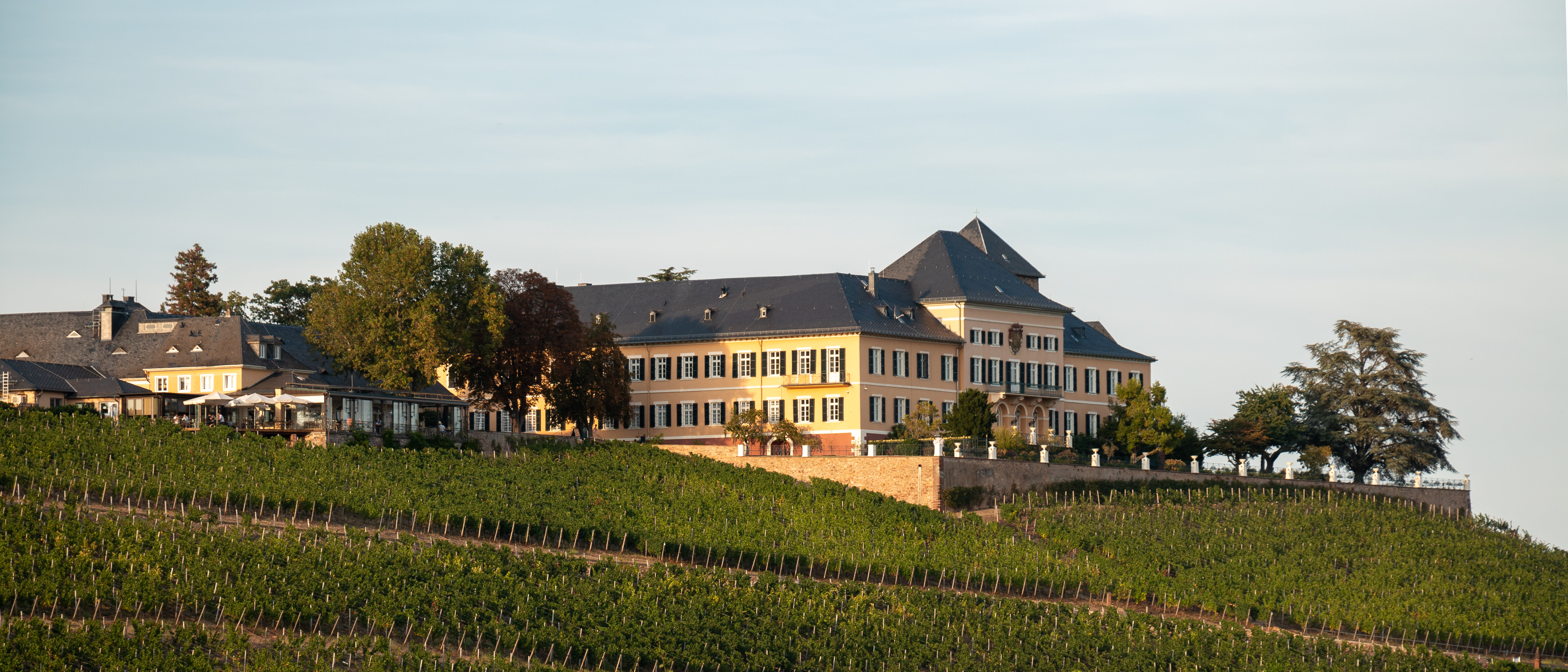
The restored palace

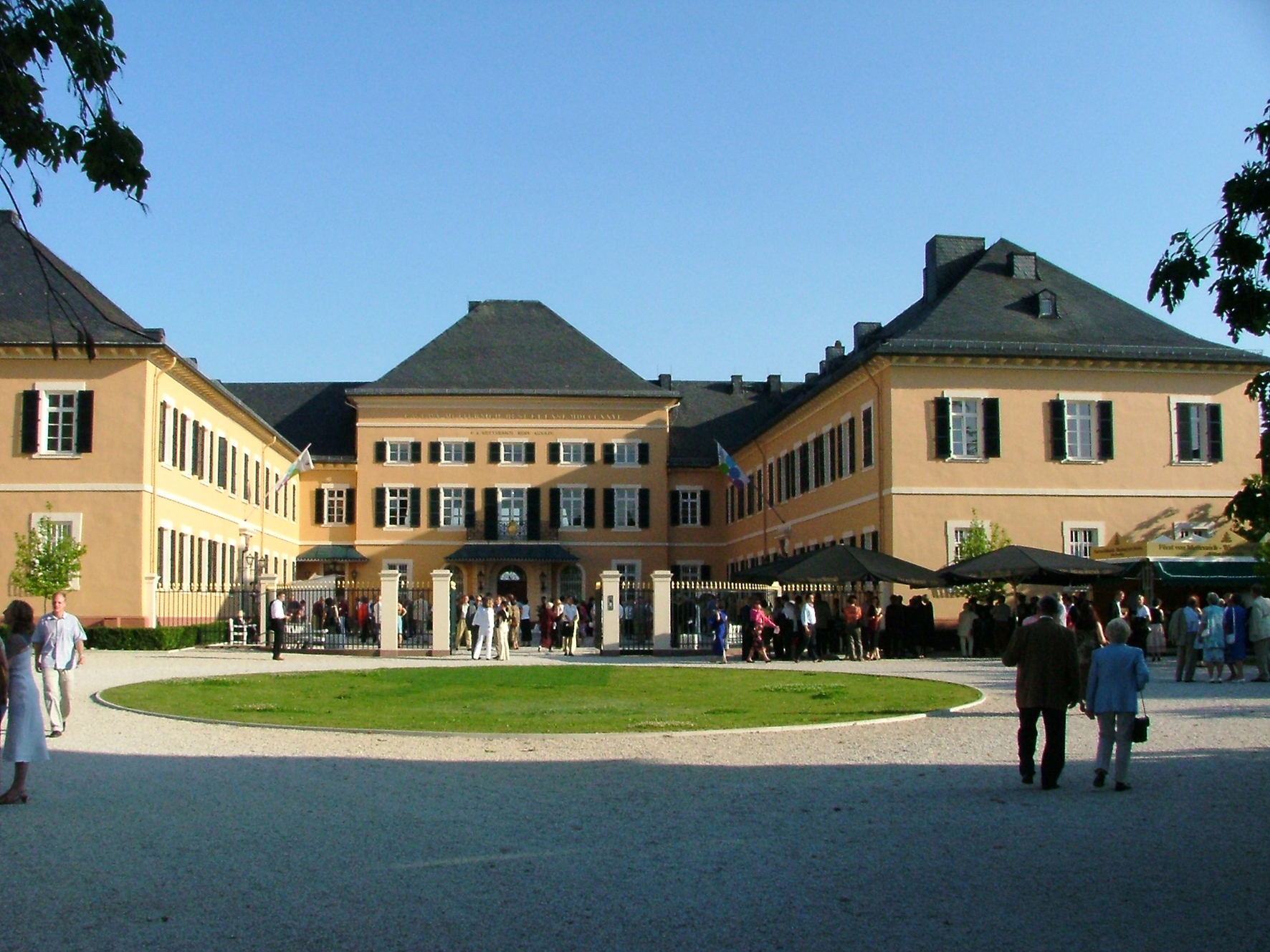
The neoclassical courtyard of Schloss Johannisberg

In 1930, when the 5th prince died, Schloss Johannisberg and the Bohemian estates were inherited by his son, Paul Alfons von Metternich-Winneburg, the 6th prince. In 1940 in Berlin, where he belonged to a circle of opponents of the Nazi regime, he met his future wife Tatiana Vassiltschikov, who had a position in the foreign office. Tatiana was born a princess, but had to flee Russia with her family in 1919, following the Bolshevik October Revolution by joining a group of people who had been evacuated by the British fleet. The couple were married in Berlin-Grunewald on 6 September 1941. Initially, they lived at Kynžvart, but in 1945, they were forced to flee their estates in Western Bohemia due to the advancing Red Army. After the expulsion of Germans from Czechoslovakia, the new Communist government confiscated the princely estates.

The princely couple sought refuge in the Rheingau. Three years before, in 1942, Schloss Johannisberg was heavily damaged during the air raids on Mainz. More than 300 bombs fell on and around, leaving the palace reduced to a shell. They first had to live in the housekeeper's flat. But determined to restore their new home, Prince Paul and Princess Tatiana embarked on a long and laborious reconstruction effort, which spanned nearly two decades, concluding in 1964. As part of the rebuilding, the roofs became more elevated than before the war. During the renovation, the princely couple also managed the winery. While the east wing of the palace was rebuilt, it was not restored as living quarters but was instead repurposed into an indoor tennis hall. In collaboration with Henkell & Söhnlein, part of the Oetker Group, the couple introduced the sparkling wine "Fürst von Metternich," which remains a notable product of the estate.

In 1974, the princely couple shared ownership of Schloss Johannisberg and the winery with the Oetker family, creating a partnership that ensured the estate's continued operation.

Prince Paul died in 1992, leaving no heirs, marking the extinction of the princely House of Metternich. However, the Metternich name endures through Franz Albrecht von Metternich-Sándor (1920–2009) and his descendants. Franz Albrecht's mother was a descendant of Klemens von Metternich, and he had been adopted by his aunt, Clementine von Metternich-Sandor (1870–1963), the daughter of Prince Richard. A significant portion of Paul's fortune was left to his mistress, which strained the financial position of Princess Tatiana. As a result, Tatiana was compelled to sell her remaining share of Schloss Johannisberg to the Oetker family. Despite the sale, she retained the right to reside on the estate until her death. In her later years, Princess Tatiana faced declining health but continued to live at the palace until her death.

=== Today ===
Schloss Johannisberg remains privately owned by the Oetker family and is not open to the public, except for special events. The estate is part of Henkell Freixenet, the wine and spirits arm of the Oetker Group. The vineyards cover approximately 35 hectares (86 acres), continuing the legacy of Riesling winemaking that has defined its history. Within the wine cellar is the so-called Bibliotheca Subterranea, which houses about 25,000 bottles of Riesling, of which most date back to the 19th century, although the oldest dates back to 1748.

In 2024, the vineyard was listed as the fifth best vineyard of the world. It was third time consecutively that the vineyard was included in the top ten of the world's best wine estates.

== Late harvest wines ==
Tradition has it that on one occasion a messenger from Heinrich von Bibra, Prince-Bishop and Abbot of Fulda, was 14 days late in bringing the papers to give the cellar master permission to start harvesting the grapes. At least two alternative stories exist to explain the delay. One is that the Prince-Bishop was away hunting and was not available to sign the permission to harvest, and the other is that he was intercepted and held by highwaymen. By this time the grapes had become affected with the "noble rot" Botrytis cinerea. The rotted grapes were then given to the local peasants, who ended up making wine of high quality. In 1775, Schloss Johannisberg made the first Spätlese Riesling followed by an Auslese wine in 1787 and an Eiswein in 1858.

Historically the estate used different colour seals for grapes of different ripeness. These classifications were used as the basis for the new German wine classification of 1971, thus :

Gelblack	Yellow	Qualitätswein
Rotlack	Red	Kabinett
Grünlack	Green	Spätlese
Silberlack	Silver	"Erstes Gewächs"
Rosalack	Pink	Auslese
Rosa-Goldlack	Pink-gold	Beerenauslese
Goldlack	Gold	Trockenbeerenauslese
Blaulack	Blue	Eiswein

Schloss Johannisberg is a single vineyard designation (Einzellage) in its own right, and one of a handful historic German vineyards which do not have to display a village name on the label. Thus, the vineyard designation on the label is Schloß Johannisberger.

Weingut Schloss Johannisberg is a member of the Verband Deutscher Prädikatsweingüter (VDP).

== Geology ==
The 35 ha of vineyards consist of a loam-loess topsoil lying on Taunus quartzite. The soils are quite stony and gravelly, enabling them to retain the day's temperature and to buffer temperature fluctuations.

== Visitors ==
The estate offers guided tours with tastings, a wine bar, shop, and various special events.

== Basilica ==
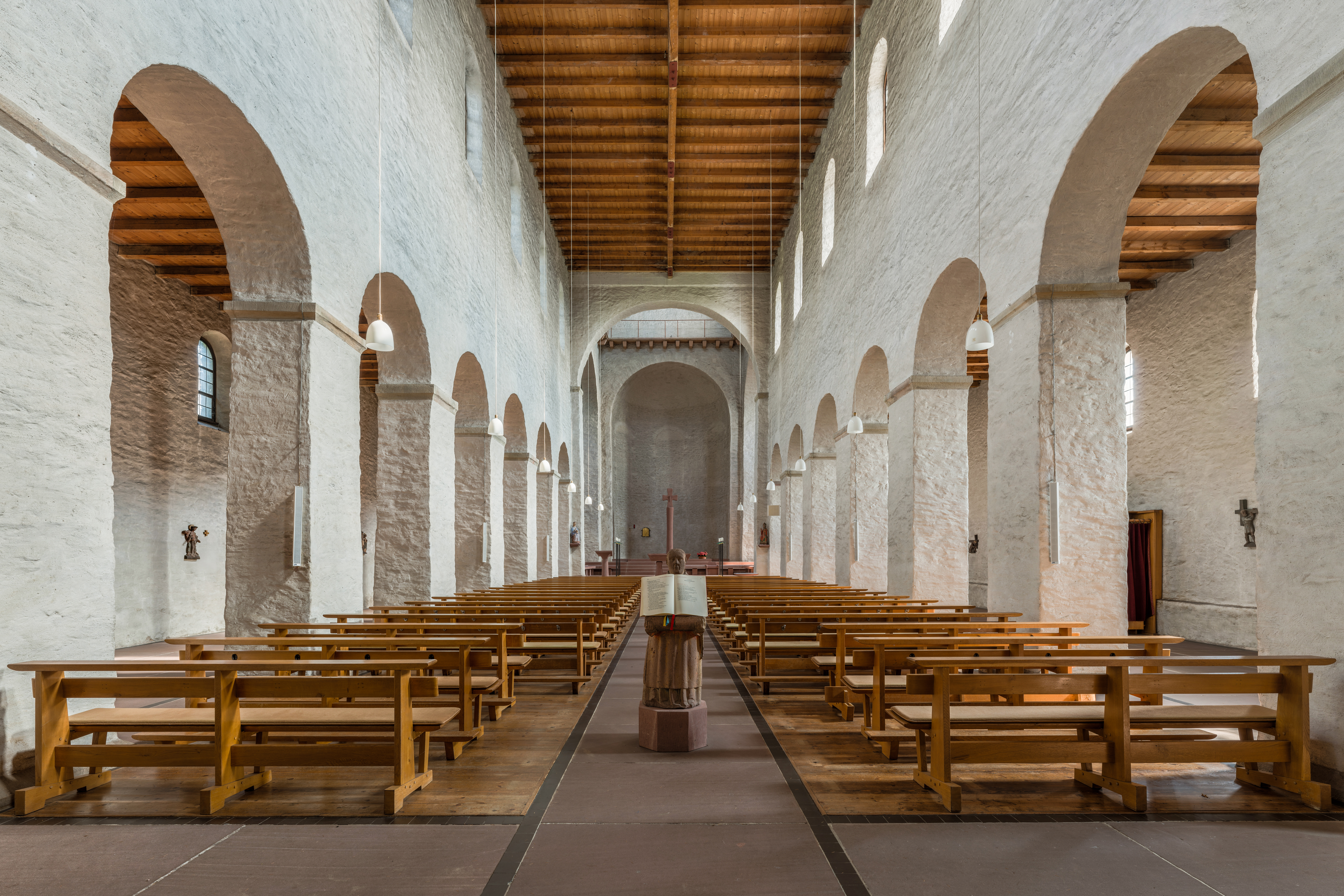
The nave of the basilica

The church, Basilika, was originally built for the Benedictine monastery and dedicated to St. Johannes (St. John the Baptist). After the destruction during World War II it was rebuilt as a Romanesque basilica and has served as the Catholic parish church for the village Johannisberg. It is also used for concerts of sacred music, of local groups and for concerts of the Rheingau Musik Festival, such as a performance of the Huelgas Ensemble.

In 1999, combined choirs of Geisenheim and St. Martin, Idstein, performed Giacomo Puccini's Messa di Gloria and, in 2001, Rutter's Requiem and Benjamin Britten's The Company of Heaven for speakers, soloists, chorus and orchestra (1937, not performed again until 1989). In 2009, the Neue Rheingauer Kantorei performed Haydn's Die Schöpfung with soloists Elisabeth Scholl, Daniel Sans and Andreas Pruys.

== Music venue ==
The Ostflügel (East Wing) was rebuilt after the destruction to serve as a tennis court. Tatiana von Metternich-Winneburg, a co-founder of the Rheingau Musik Festival, turned the hall into a public concert venue, staging 10 of the 19 concerts of the first summer season in 1988, and many recitals and chamber music performances every year following. After her husband's death the hall was named "Fürst-von-Metternich-Saal". von Metternich-Winneburg was "Vorsitzende des Kuratoriums" (president of the festival's curators) until her death. The tradition has been continued by the present owners. Spanish flamenco guitarist Paco de Lucia for instance performed there in June 2012.
