= Gerechtigkeitsspirale =

- Spiral of justice
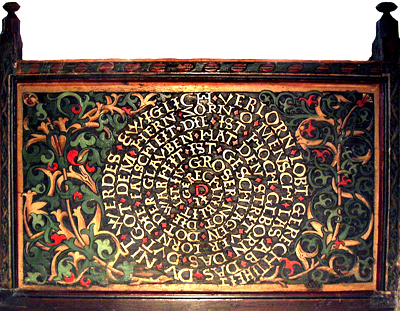
- Artist: Erhart Falckener
- Year: 1510
- Type: Wood, relief carved
- Location: St. Valentin, Kiedrich, Germany; 50.0412°N 8.0847°E

Gerechtigkeitsspirale (German: "spiral of justice") is a relief carving of a poem at the pilgrimage church of St. Valentin in Kiedrich, in Hesse, Germany. The text is carved in the form of a spiral on the front of one of the pews for the congregation, creating possibly the earliest known shape poem in the German language. The carving is one of several decorative designs on the pews in the church, and was created in 1510 by the master carpenter Erhart Falckener.

== History ==
The pews, including the spiral of justice, were commissioned by the former minister of Kiedrich, Zweifuss, who also went by the Latin name Bipes. The artist was Erhart Falckener, a master carpenter, who made the relief carving in late Gothic style in 1510. He created a spiral of text surrounded by flower ornaments of acanthus (left) and thistle (right). The tendrils are stylized and include a caricature in the form of a human face in profile, just above and to the right of the last letter of the word "verlorn" (lost). The church and its late Gothic interior have remained intact over the centuries, a very rare case.

== Text ==
The text is carved in German in capital letters, creating in a spiral read from the centre outwards. The height of the letters is 4 centimetres (1.6 in) at the centre, growing to 6 centimetres (2.4 in) at the edges. The original German text, and two possible translations into modern English, read:

German

DIE GERECHTIKEIT LIT IN GROSER NOT
DIE WARHEIT IST GESCHLAGEN DOT
DER GLAVBEN HAT DEN STRIT VER LORN
DIE FALSCHEIT DIE IST HOCH GEBORN
DAS DVT GOT DEM HERN ZORN
O MENSCH LAS AB
DAS DV NIT WERDES EWIGLICH VERLORN
LOBT GERECHTIKEIT

Literal translation

Justice suffered in great need.
Truth is slain dead.
Faith has lost the battle.
Falsehood is of high birth.
That makes God the Lord angry.
O man, let go
that you may not be lost eternally.
Praise justice.

Adaptation

Righteousness suffers in great need:
Truth is beaten to death,
Faith has given up the fight;
Lies are raised on high.
All this angers the Lord our God;
O mankind, desist.
That you may not be forever lost:
Praise Righteousness.

== Analysis ==
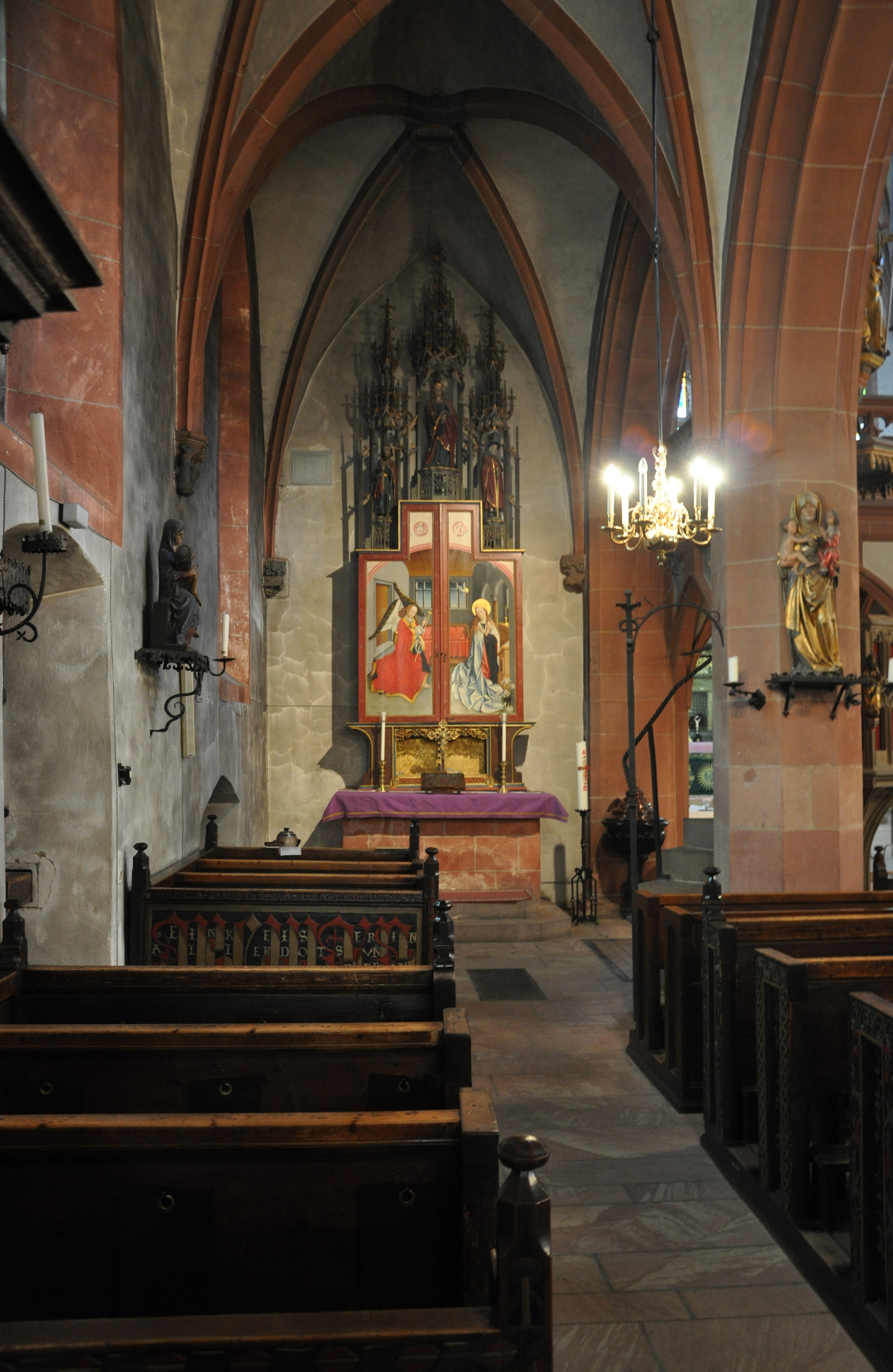
The northern aisle of the church.

The church contains other decorative carvings. Unlike other more traditional ribbons and text inscriptions by Falckener, this text can be read as a call for social justice and religious integrity during the time of the Reformation, a few years before the Palatine Peasants' War of 1525. The content of the text recalls the struggle of the virtues and vices described by the early Christian poet Prudentius in his work Psychomachia. This theme was widespread in the 15th and 16th century in a simple German language formulation of the Reformatio Sigismundi, especially in a printed version from 1476.

The topic of the spiral, an outcry for justice ("Schrei nach Gerechtigkeit") is the theme of a 2015–2016 exposition planned in Mainz about life at the mid-Rhine at the wake of the Reformation ("Leben am Mittelrhein am Vorabend der Reformation").

== Roland Stark ==
The first lines of the text are used as the epigraph of the 2013 crime fiction book Tod im Klostergarten (Death in the Abbey Garden) by Roland Stark.

== Sources ==
- Werner Kremer, 500 Jahre Laiengestühl 1510 – 2010 in der St. Valentinuskirche Kiedrich im Rheingau geschaffen von Erhart Falckener (documentation), Förderkreis Kiedricher Geschichts- und Kulturzeugen, Kiedrich im Rheingau 2010
- Werner Kremer, Falckener Erhart in Kiedricher Persönlichkeiten aus sieben Jahrhunderten (Personalities from Kiedrich for seven centuries) (pp. 45–49), self-published work sponsored by Kiedricher Geschichts- und Kulturzeugen e.V. (Kiedrich Historical and Cultural Society), Kiedrich im Rheingau 2008
- H. Sobel, Die Kirchenmöbel Erhart Falckeners und seiner Werkstatt mit besonderer Berücksichtigung der Flachschnitzerei (Erhart Falckener's church furniture and his workshop with special consideration of flat-cutting), self-published via Gesellschaft für Mittelrheinische Kirchengeschichte (Society for Middle Rhine Church History), Mainz 1980 (Dissertation)
