= St. Valentin, Kiedrich =

St. Valentin
- Basilica of SS Dionysius and Valentinus
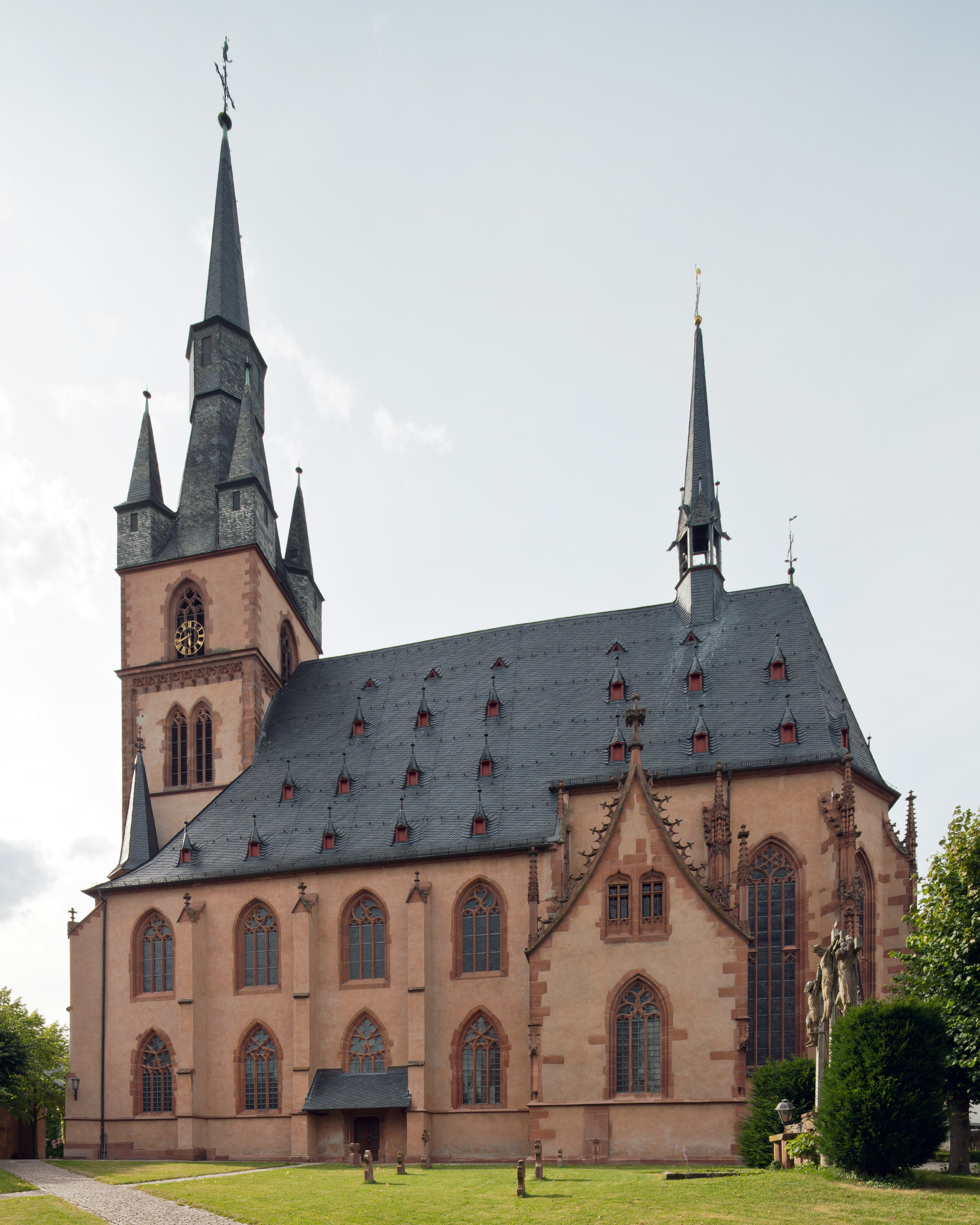
- Basilica of SS Dionysius and Valentinus, from the south

- 50°02′28″N 8°05′05″E
- Location: Kiedrich, Hesse, Germany
- Denomination: Catholic
- Website: www.pastoraler-raum-eltville.de

History
- Dedication: St. Valentine; St. Dionysius

Architecture
- Style: Gothic
- Completed: 1490s

Administration
- Diocese: Limburg

St. Valentin is the common name for the Catholic parish church and Basilica minor Basilica of SS Dionysius and Valentinus in Kiedrich in the Rheingau, in Hesse, Germany. It was built at the end of the 15th century in the Gothic style. Its organ is one of the oldest playable organs in Germany (built c. 1500). The church was a pilgrimage destination for people with epilepsy and therefore has carved wooden laity stalls, including one decorated with the "Gerechtigkeitsspirale" (Spiral of justice).

== History ==
The parish church was mainly built at the end of the 15th century in Gothic style. The church is dedicated to St. Valentine, the patron saint of people with epilepsy (Fallende Krankheit) and lovers, housing relics which came in 1350 from Eberbach Abbey to Kiedrich. Income from the pilgrimage enabled the building of the church. The main entrance in the west front is topped by a tympanum which shows both the Annunciation and the Coronation of Mary.

Many people with epilepsy made the pilgrimage to the church. It was therefore furbished with unique carved laity stalls for the congregation; congregants in Gothic times normally attended service standing. The pews are decorated with carvings of ornaments, flowers, vines and inscriptions in Gothic alphabet. One front shows the elaborate "Gerechtigkeitsspirale" (Spiral of justice), an inscription in the form of a spiral. The Kiedrich Madonna in the choir is a wooden gilded sculpture dating from 1330. Influenced by French style, it shows a young woman who turns smiling to her child.

The cemetery around the church is surrounded by a wall and includes the funeral chapel, the Michaelskapelle (St. Michael's Chapel).

The church is a Basilica minor as of 29 June 2010. Restoration work began in 2012 and is slated to be complete in 2017. The choir, altar and stained-glass windows were completed and the organ restored in 2014.

The parish is part of the Pastoraler Raum Eltville, together with St. Peter und Paul, Eltville, St. Markus, Erbach, and St. Vincentius, Hattenheim

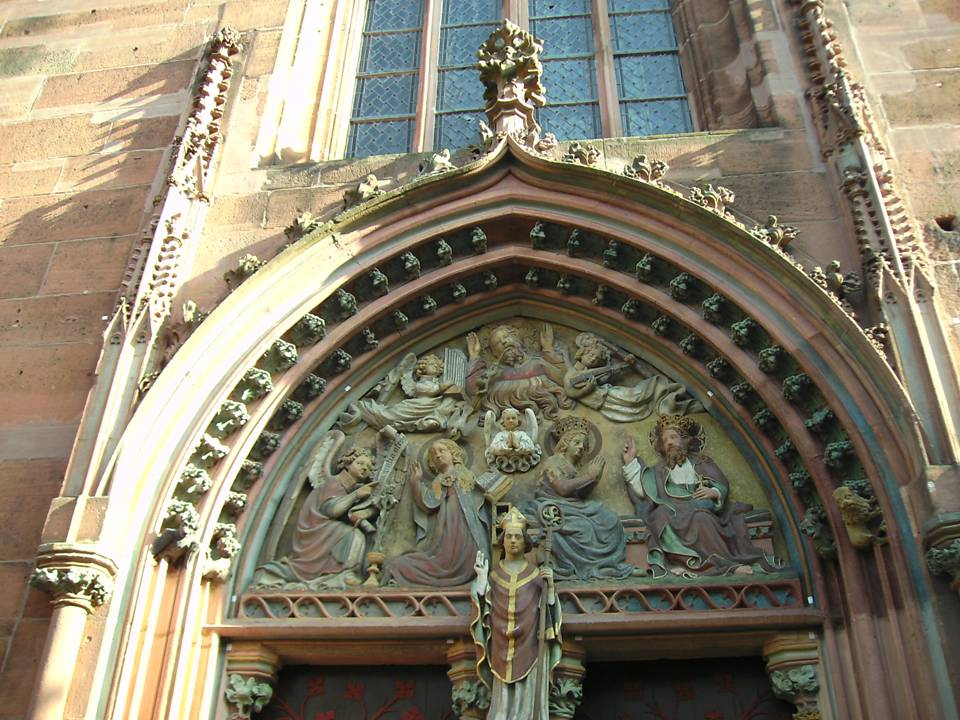
Tympanum above the main entrance, with Annunciation and Coronation of Mary

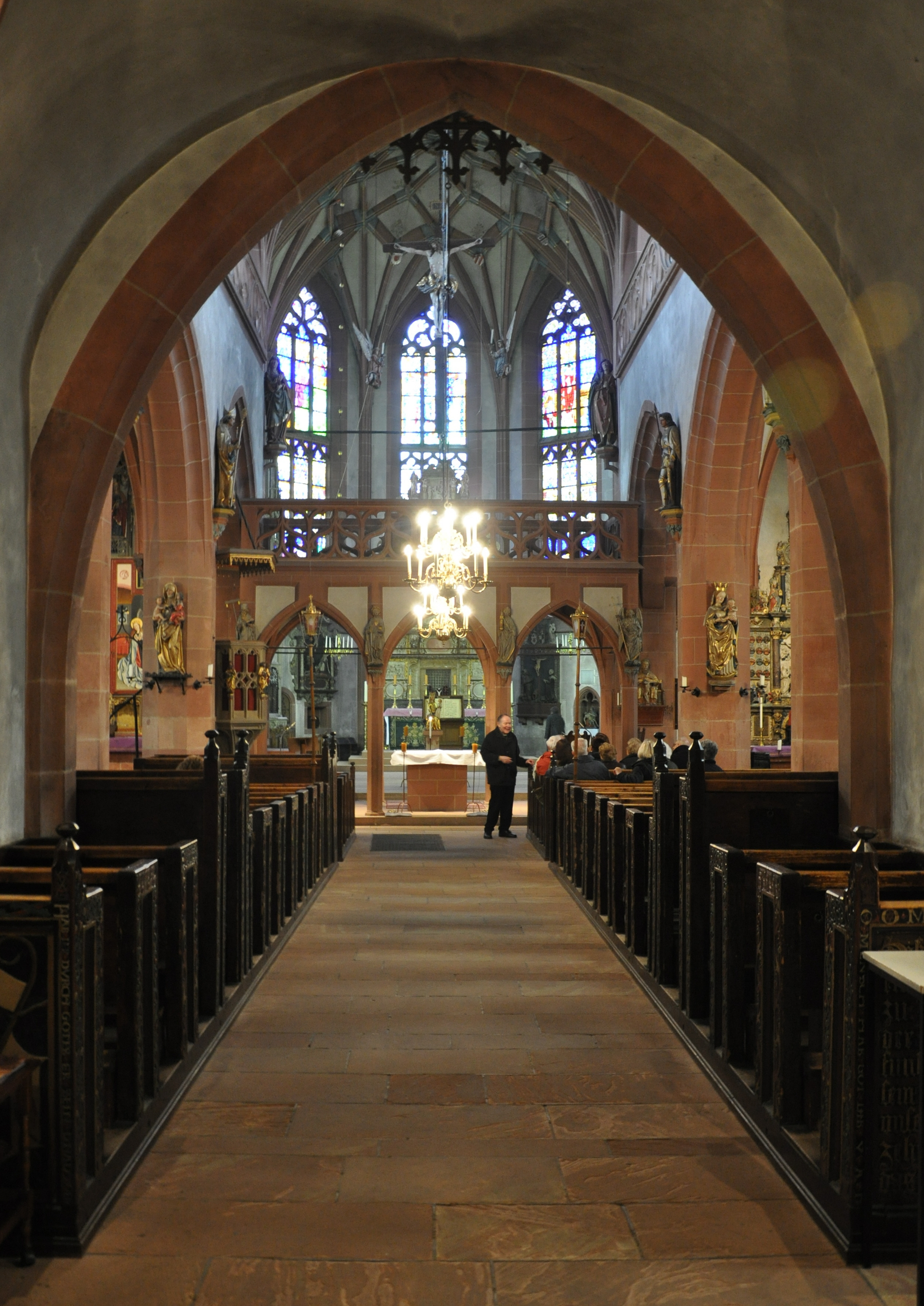
Pews for the congregation

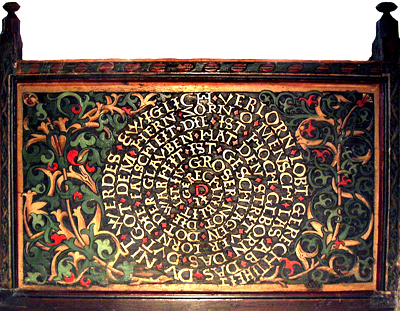
The Gerechtigkeitsspirale decoration on a church pew

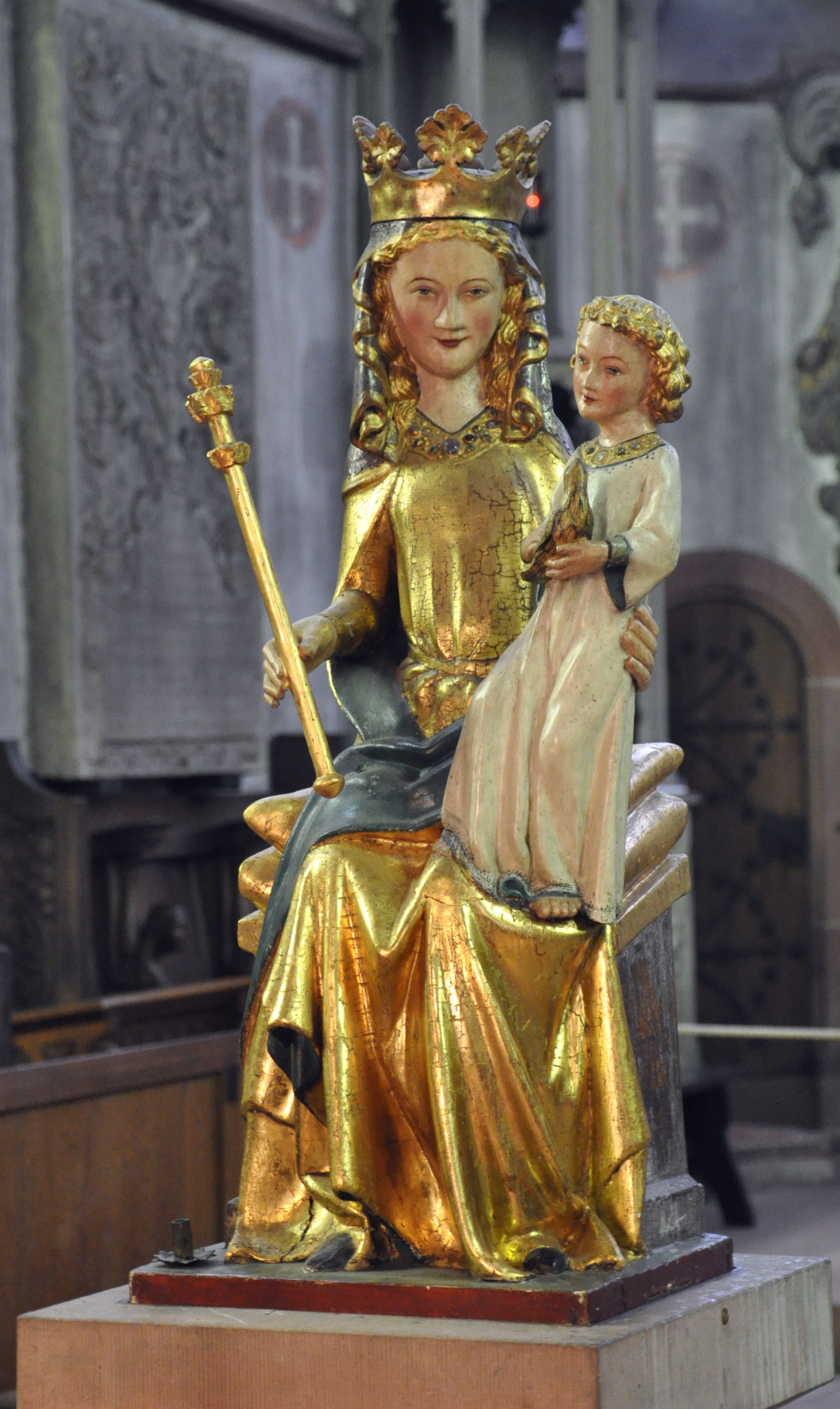
The Kiedrich Madonna; in the French-influenced Gothic style of the Rheinland and Cologne, circa 1330

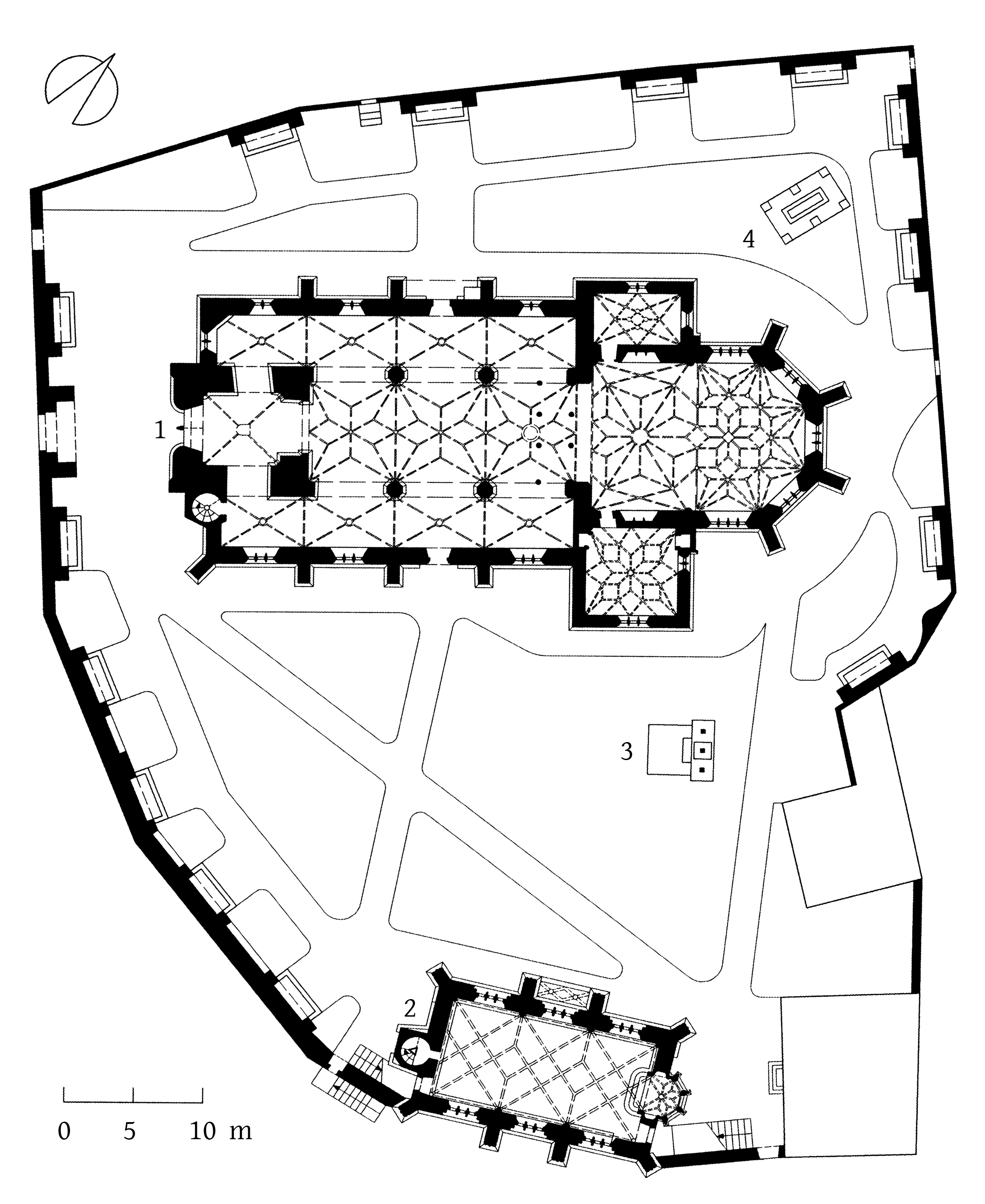
Plan of the property with church, St. Michael's Chapel, and cemetery wall

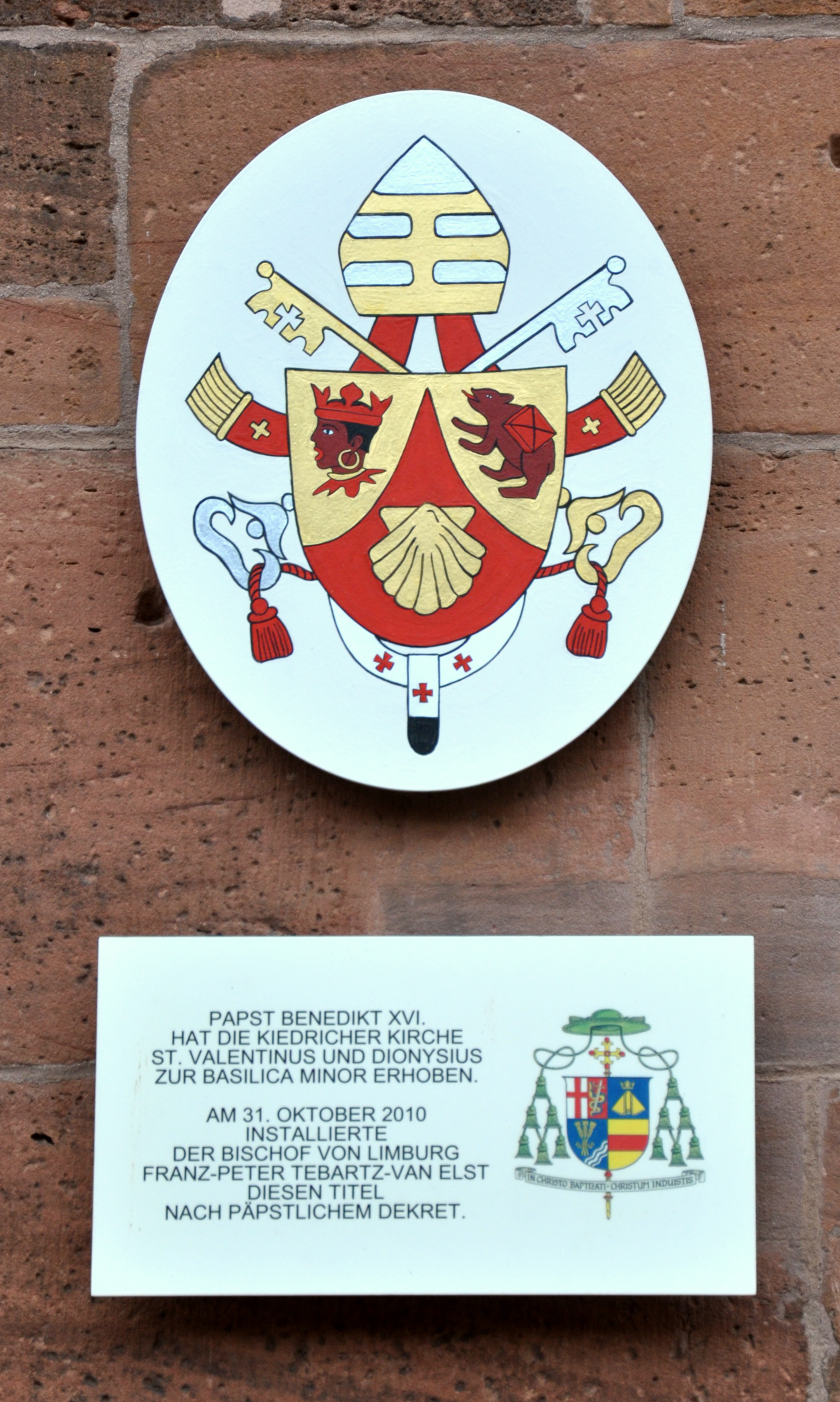
The church became a Basilica minor in 2010

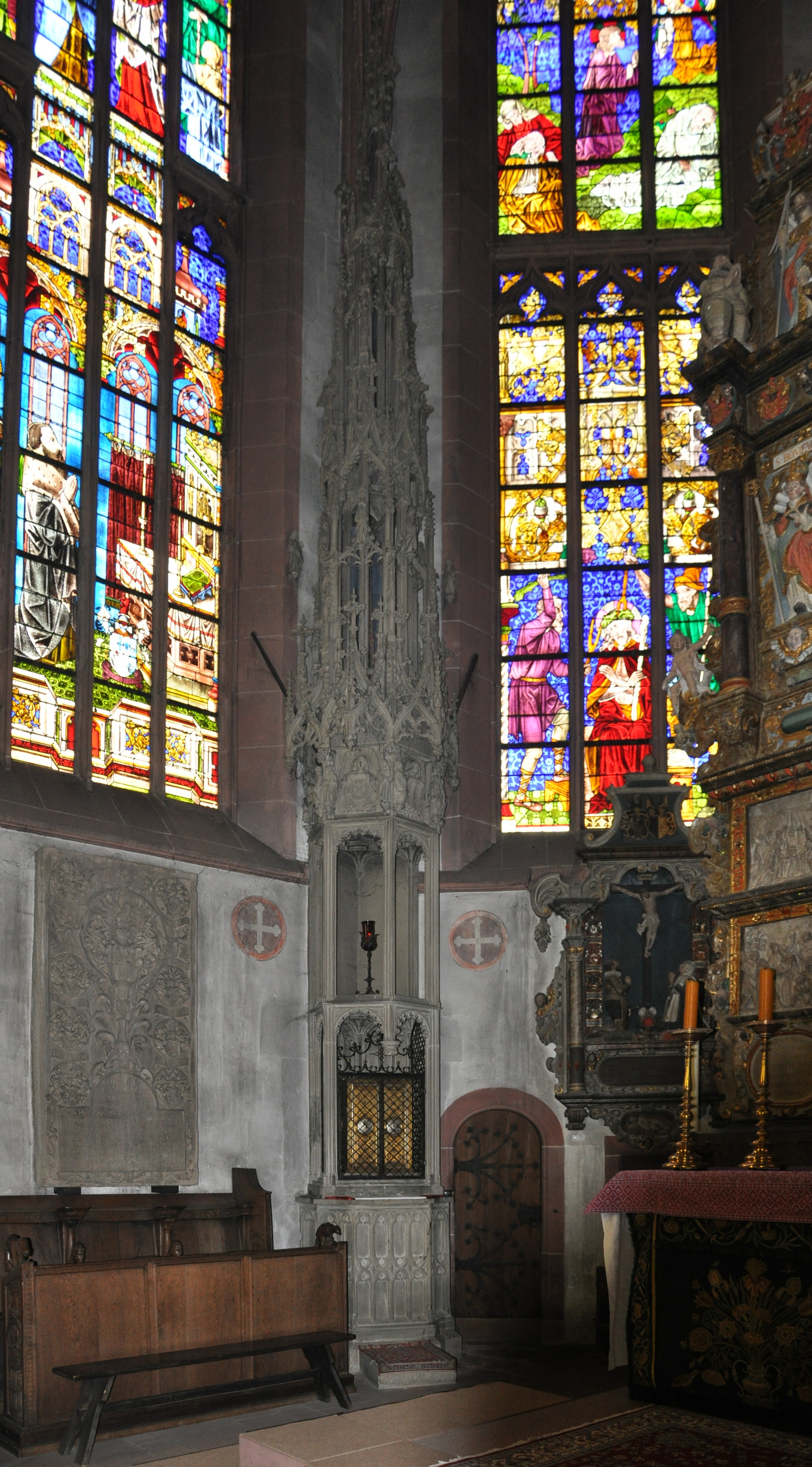
Stained-glass windows

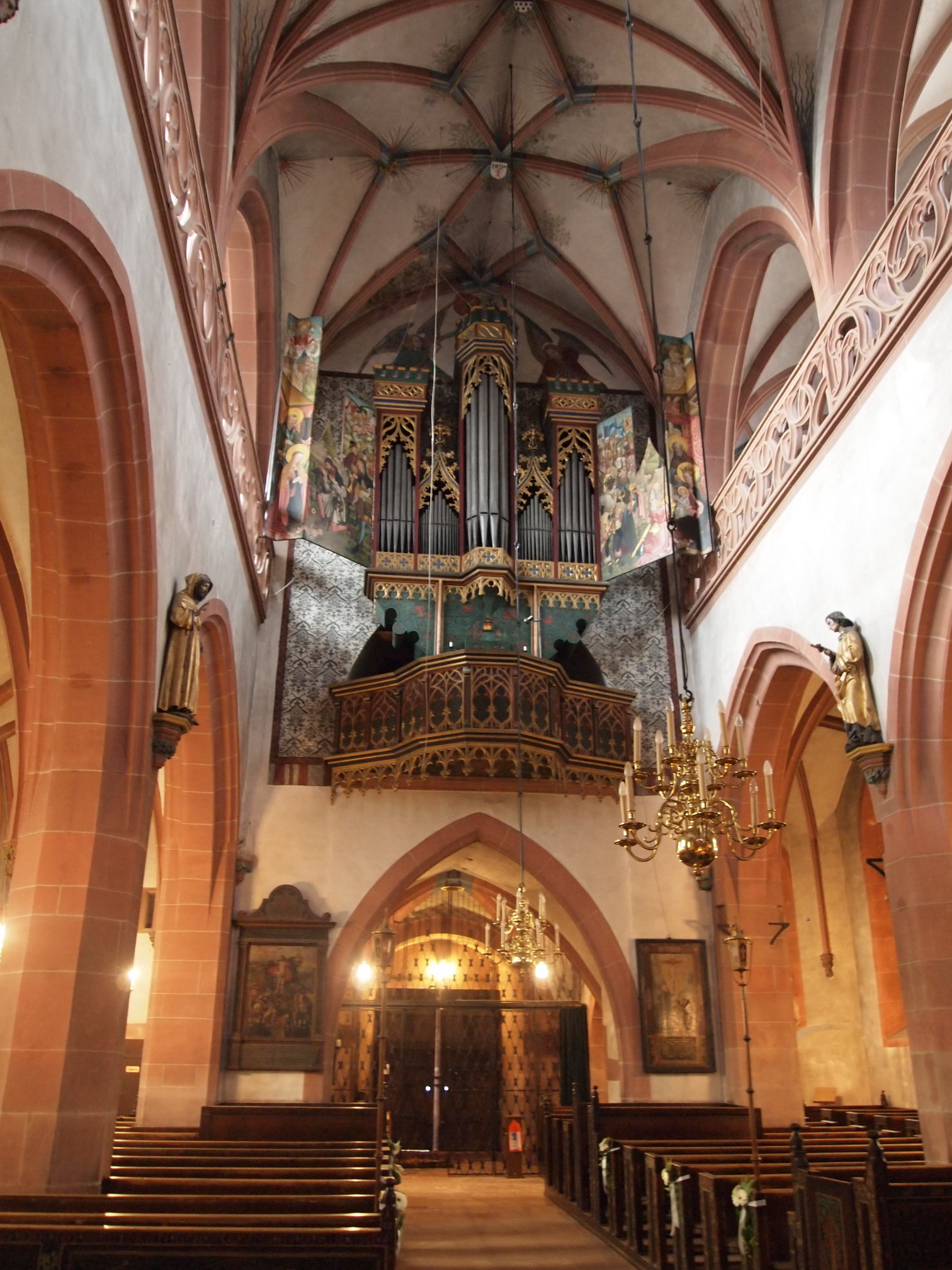
The organ was restored in 2014

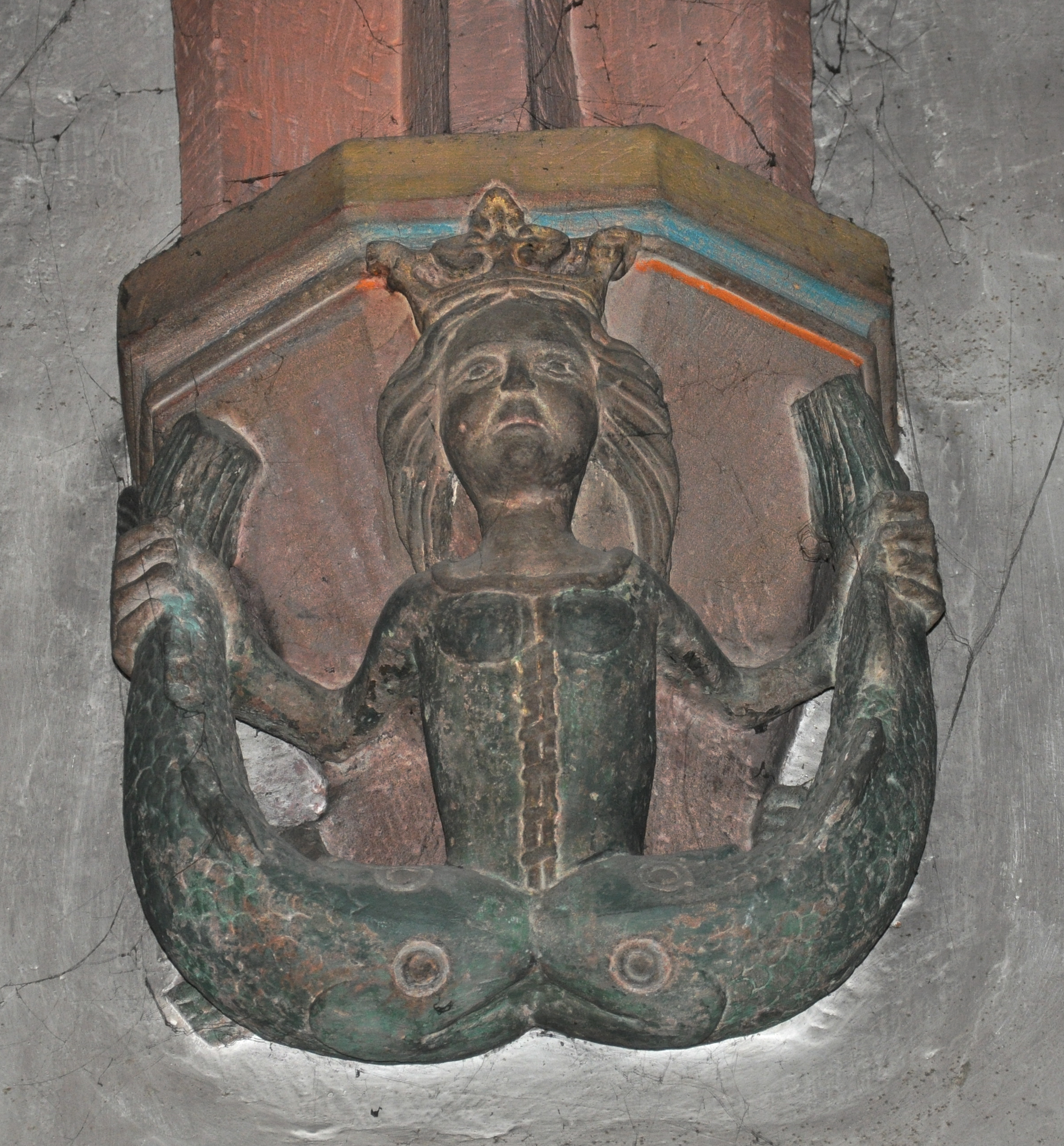
Before restoration, 2011

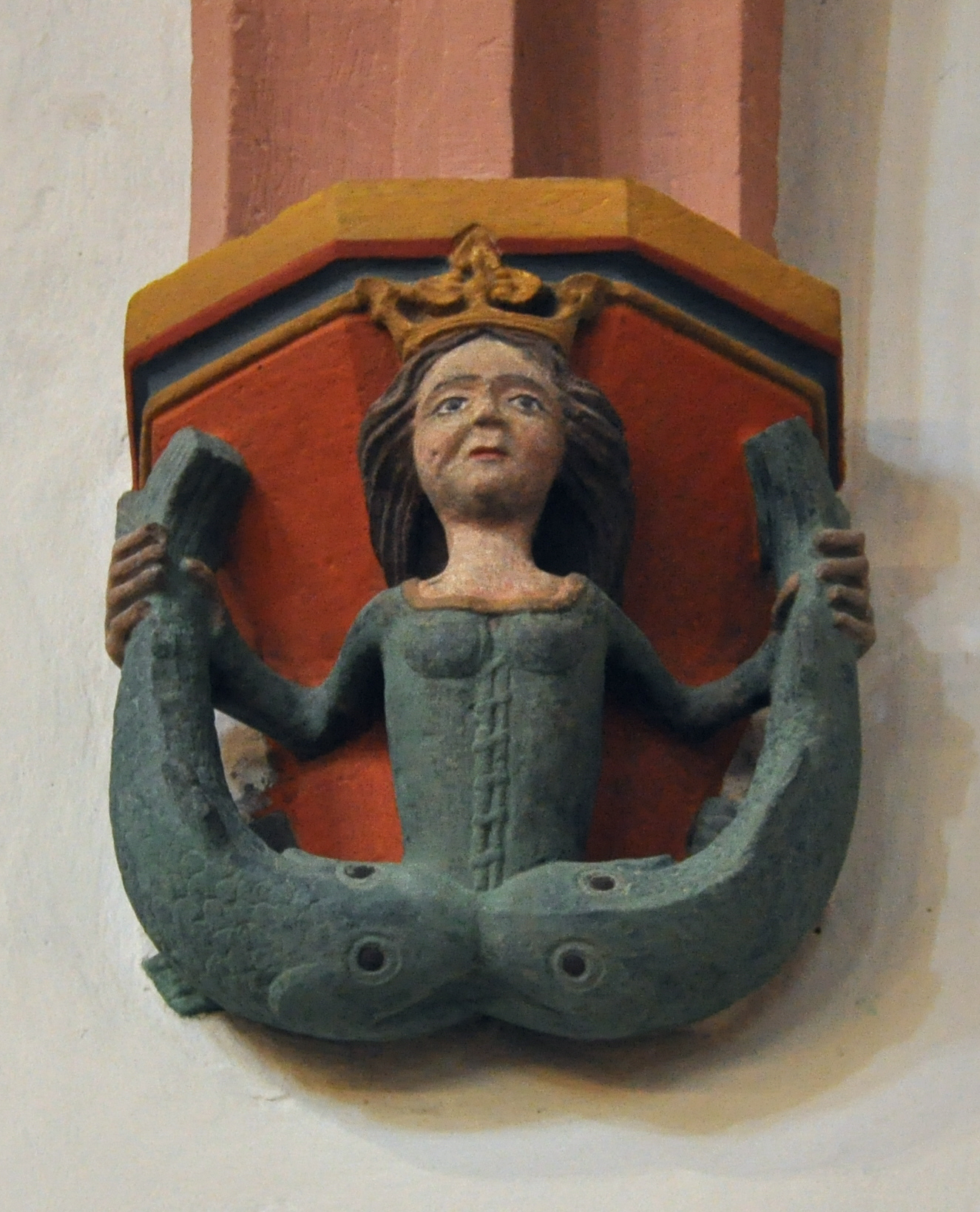
After restoration, 2015

== Kiedricher Chorbuben ==
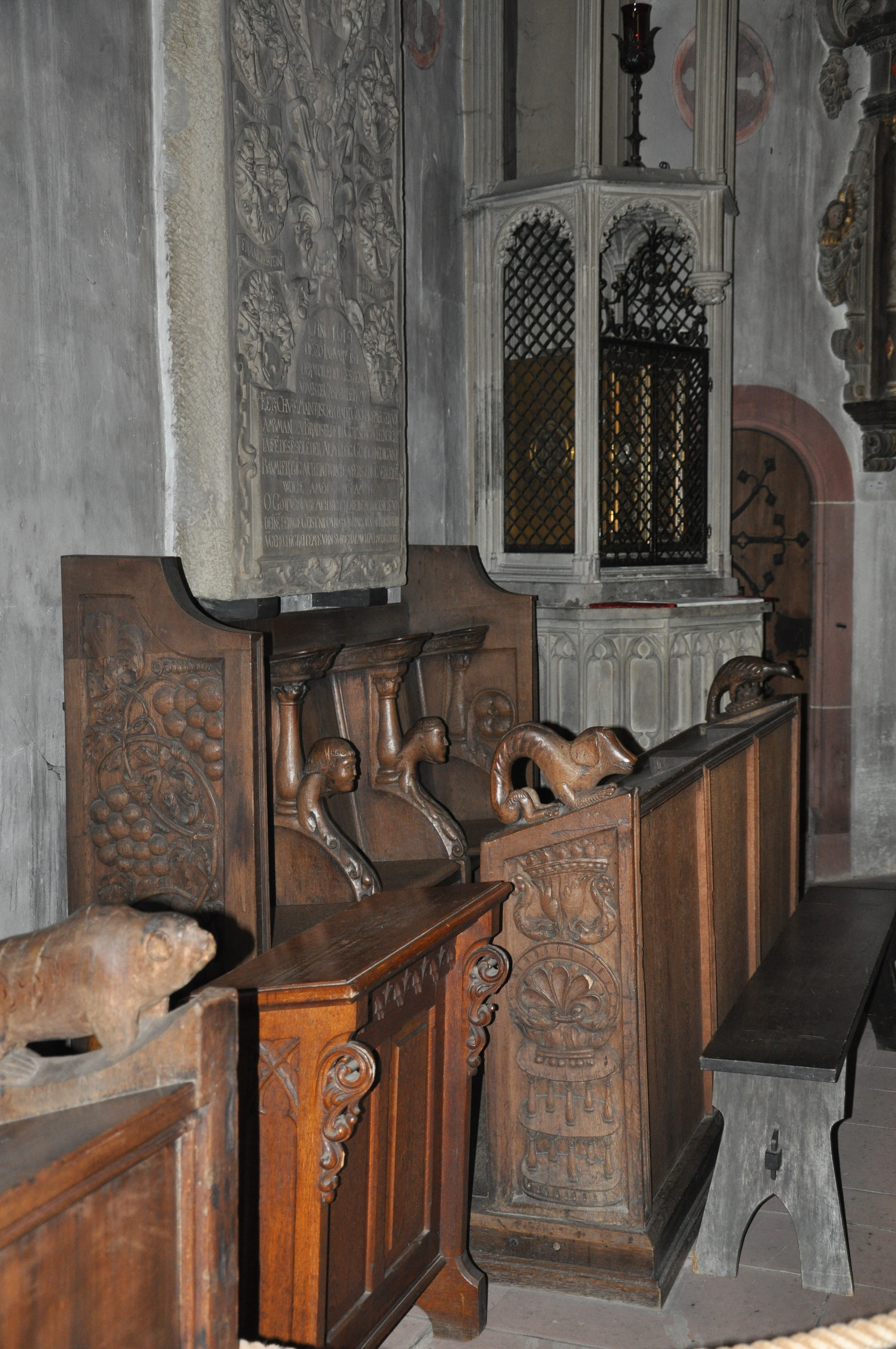
Elaborate carving on the choir stalls

The boys' choir Kiedricher Chorbuben was first mentioned in 1333. They perform a special Germanic version of Gregorian chant, once every Sunday except during summer vacation. Members have included the siblings Andreas and Elisabeth Scholl. Elisabeth was the first girl admitted to the choir.

== Organ ==
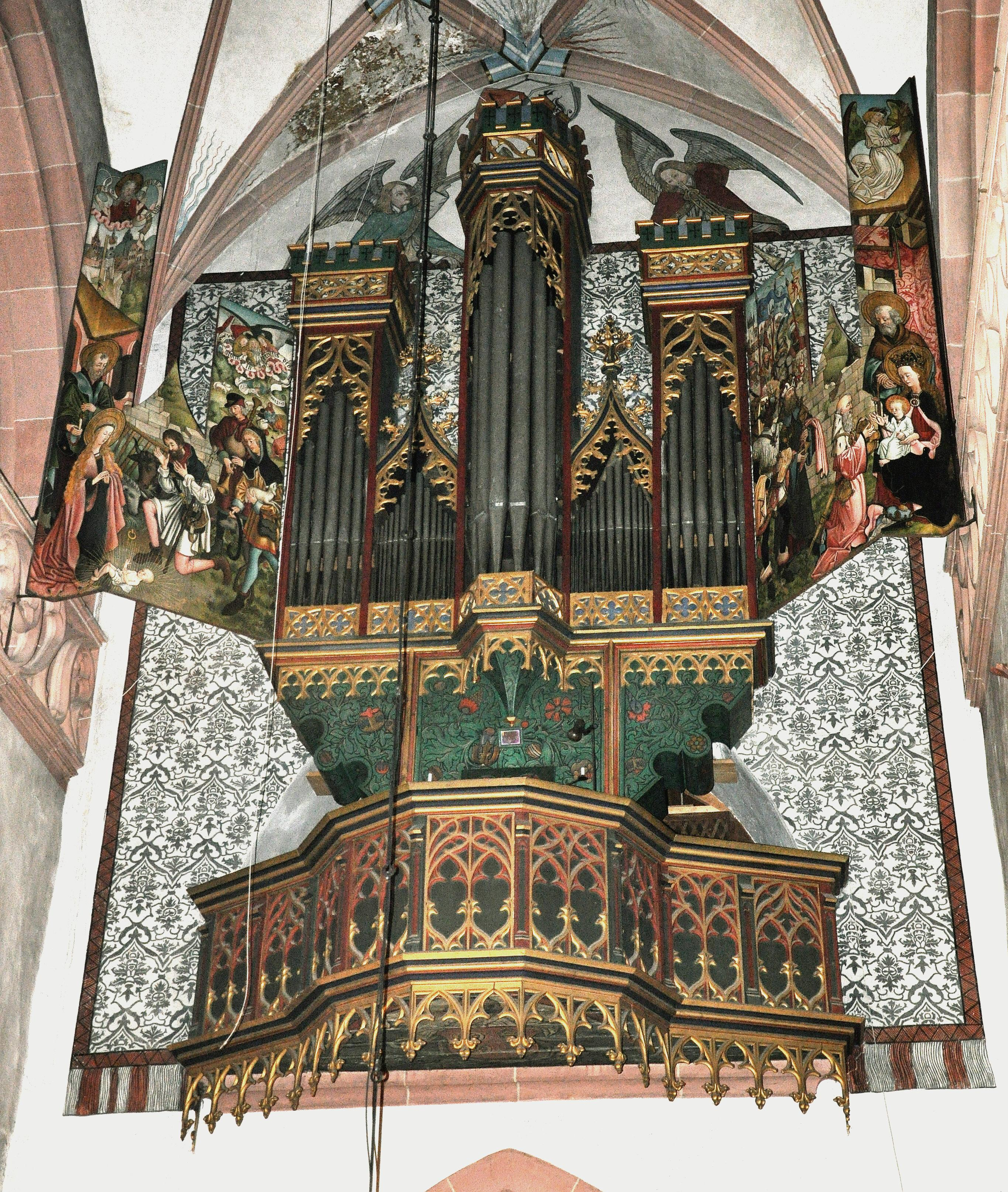
Late Gothic organ

The organ is one of the oldest playable organs, the oldest in Hesse. The instrument was built around 1500 by an anonymous organ builder, first probably with one manual. Repairs are documented for 1686 and 1692. Elias Salvianer restored the organ in 1710. His contract documents the disposition of the organ for the first time. A pedal was added in 1722. From 1790 at the latest, the instrument was not playable.

The English Baronet Sir John Sutton financed a renovation, performed from 1858 by the Belgian organ builder August Hooghuys from Bruges. From 1985 to 1987, the organ was restored again by Orgelbau Kuhn.

== Literature ==
- Josef Staab: St.-Valentinuskirche in Kiedrich. 1493–1993. Zur 500-Jahrfeier ihrer Vollendung. (ed.): Katholisches Pfarramt St. Valentin, Kiedrich 1993, ISBN 3-921865-04-2
- Claudia Wels: Die Pfarrkirche St. Valentinus zu Kiedrich und die spätgotischen Landkirchen im Rheingau. Ländliche Sakralarchitektur mit städtischem Charakter. Philipps-Universität Marburg 2003. (Dissertation)
- Claudia Wels: Die Pfarrkirche St. Valentinus in Kiedrich und ihr "städtischer" Charakter. In: Stephanie Hahn, Michael H. Sprenger (ed.): Herrschaft - Architektur - Raum: Festschrift für Ulrich Schütte zum 60. Geburtstag. Lukas Verlag, Berlin 2008, ISBN 978-3-86732-024-5, pages 17–31.
