= Kiedrich =

- Municipality
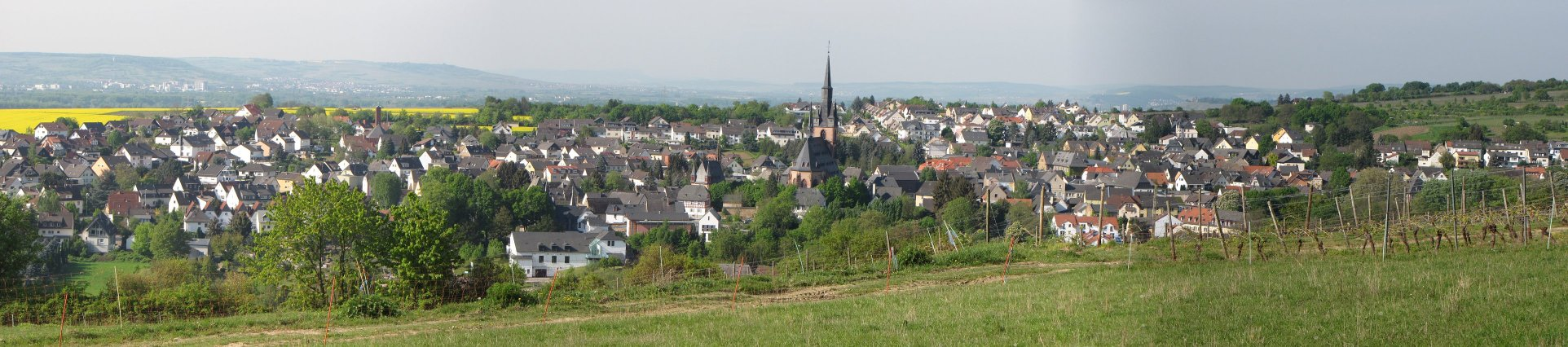

- Coat of arms

- Location of Kiedrich within Rheingau-Taunus-Kreis district
- Interactive map of Kiedrich
- Location within Germany Location within Hesse
- Coordinates: 50°2′27″N 8°5′5″E
- Country: Germany
- State: Hesse
- Admin. region: Darmstadt
- District: Rheingau-Taunus-Kreis

Government
  - Mayor (2023–29): Winfried Steinmacher (SPD)

Area
  - Total: 12.35 km^{2} (4.77 sq mi)
- Elevation: 150 m (490 ft)

Population (2025-12-31)
  - Total: 3,821
  - Density: 309.4/km^{2} (801.3/sq mi)
- Time zone: UTC+01:00 (CET)
  - Summer (DST): UTC+02:00 (CEST)
- Postal codes: 65399
- Dialling codes: 06123
- Vehicle registration: RÜD

Kiedrich is a municipality in the Rheingau-Taunus-Kreis in the Regierungsbezirk of Darmstadt in Hesse, Germany.

== Geography ==
Kiedrich lies in the Rheingau region on the southern slope of the Taunus mountains, approximately 2 km north of the town of Eltville am Rhein and 3 km from the banks of the Rhine. It borders the community of Schlangenbad to the north and the town of Eltville in the east, south, and west.

== History ==
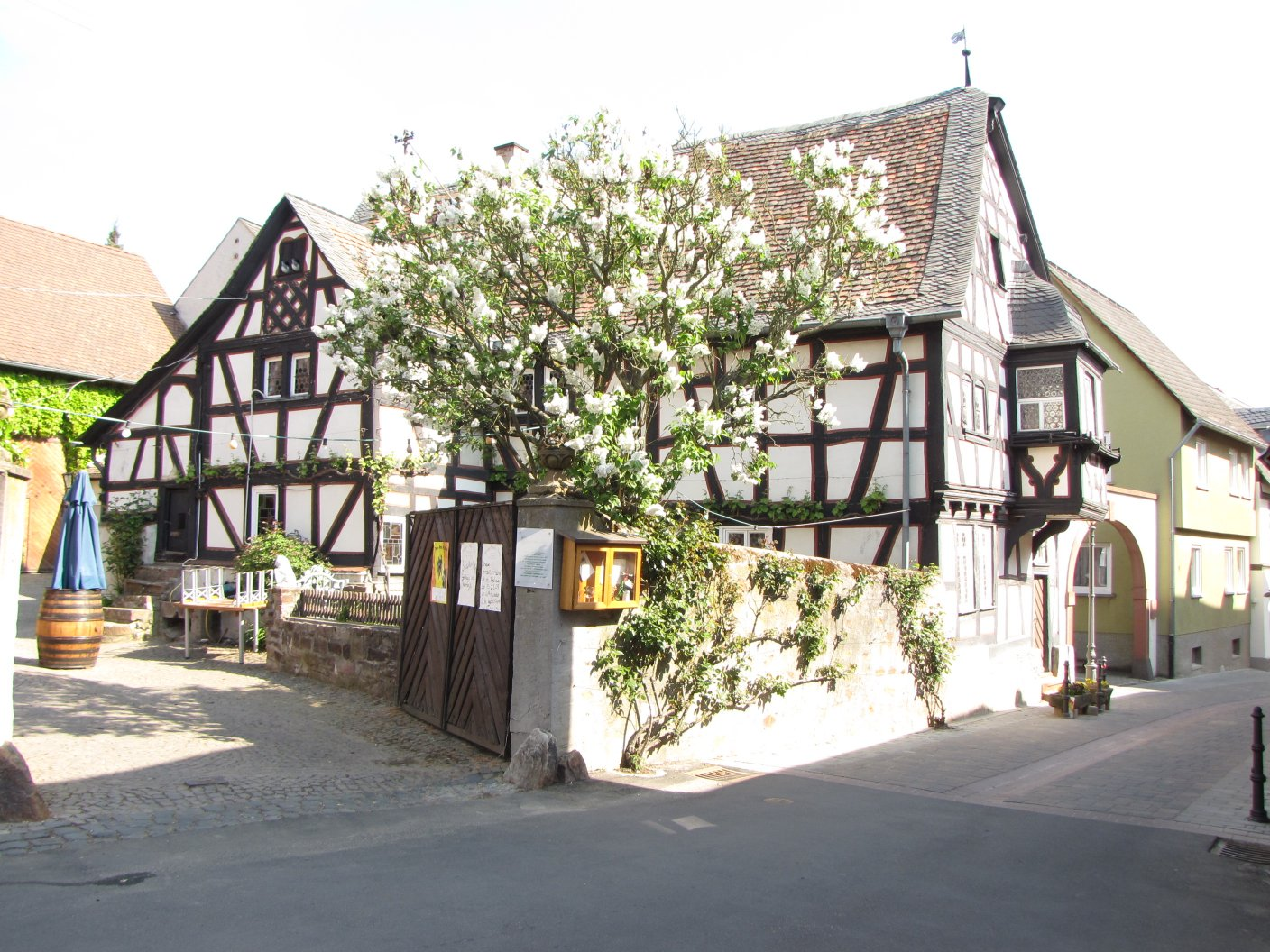
Fränkische Dorfschmiede

Kiedrich was first mentioned in a document from the Archbishopric of Mainz, which, though undated, is known to have originated during the tenure of Archbishop Frederick (937-954). Around 1160, construction began on Scharfenstein Castle. Winegrowing in Kiedrich was recorded as early as 1131.

Kiedrich was part of Electoral Mainz (the Archbishopric) and passed to the Duchy of Nassau in 1806. In 1866, it was incorporated into Prussia. The community avoided amalgamation with other municipalities during Hesse's municipal restructuring.

== Government ==
Through political activities in the three Kiedrich active parties (SPD, CDU, FDP), Kiedrichers have been involved with the framework of the local Agenda 21.

The office of mayor in Kiedrich is currently held by Winfried Steinmacher (SPD), who was directly elected through the first vote system in November 2005, with 77.7% of the vote.

=== Election results ===
Results of the municipal election held on 26 March 2006:

Parties and voter communities		% 2006	Seats; 2006	% 2001	Seats; 2001
CDU	Christian Democratic Union of Germany	28.4	6	33.4	8
SPD	Social Democratic Party of Germany	60.5	14	57.5	13
FDP	Free Democratic Party	11.1	3	9.1	2
Total		100.0	23	100.0	23
Voter turnout in %		49.5		65.9	

== Culture ==
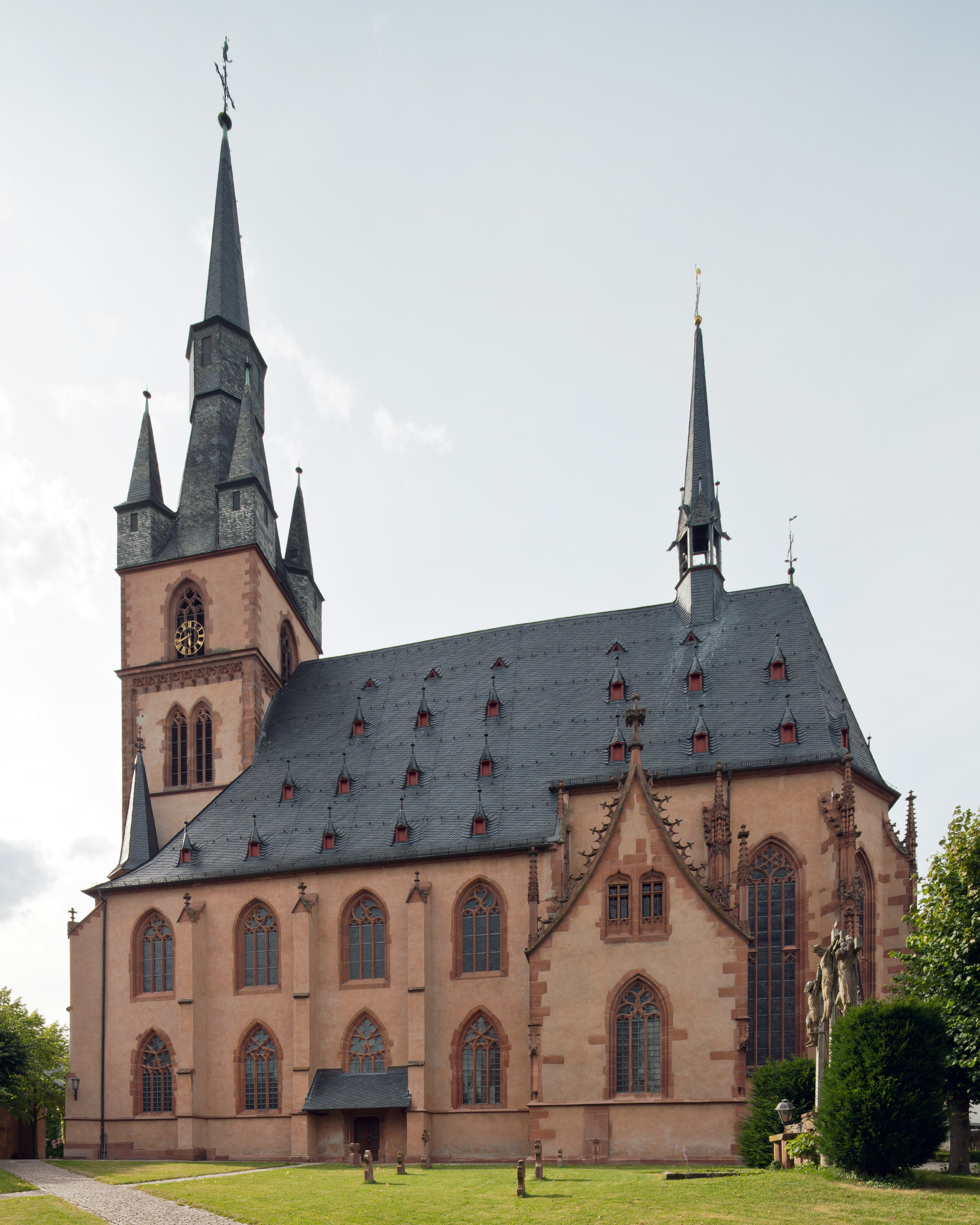
Saint Valentine’s Catholic parish church

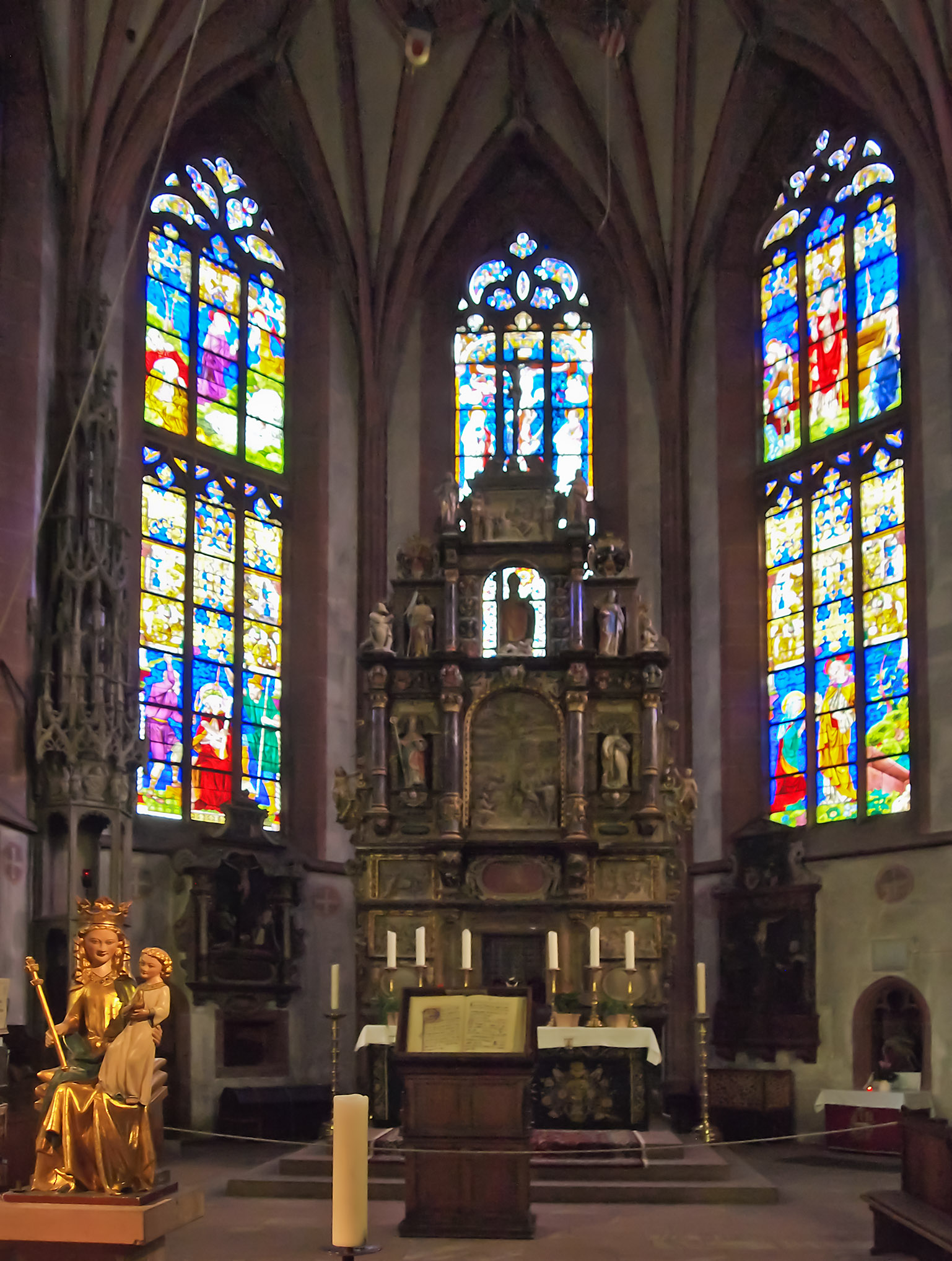
Interior of Saint Valentine

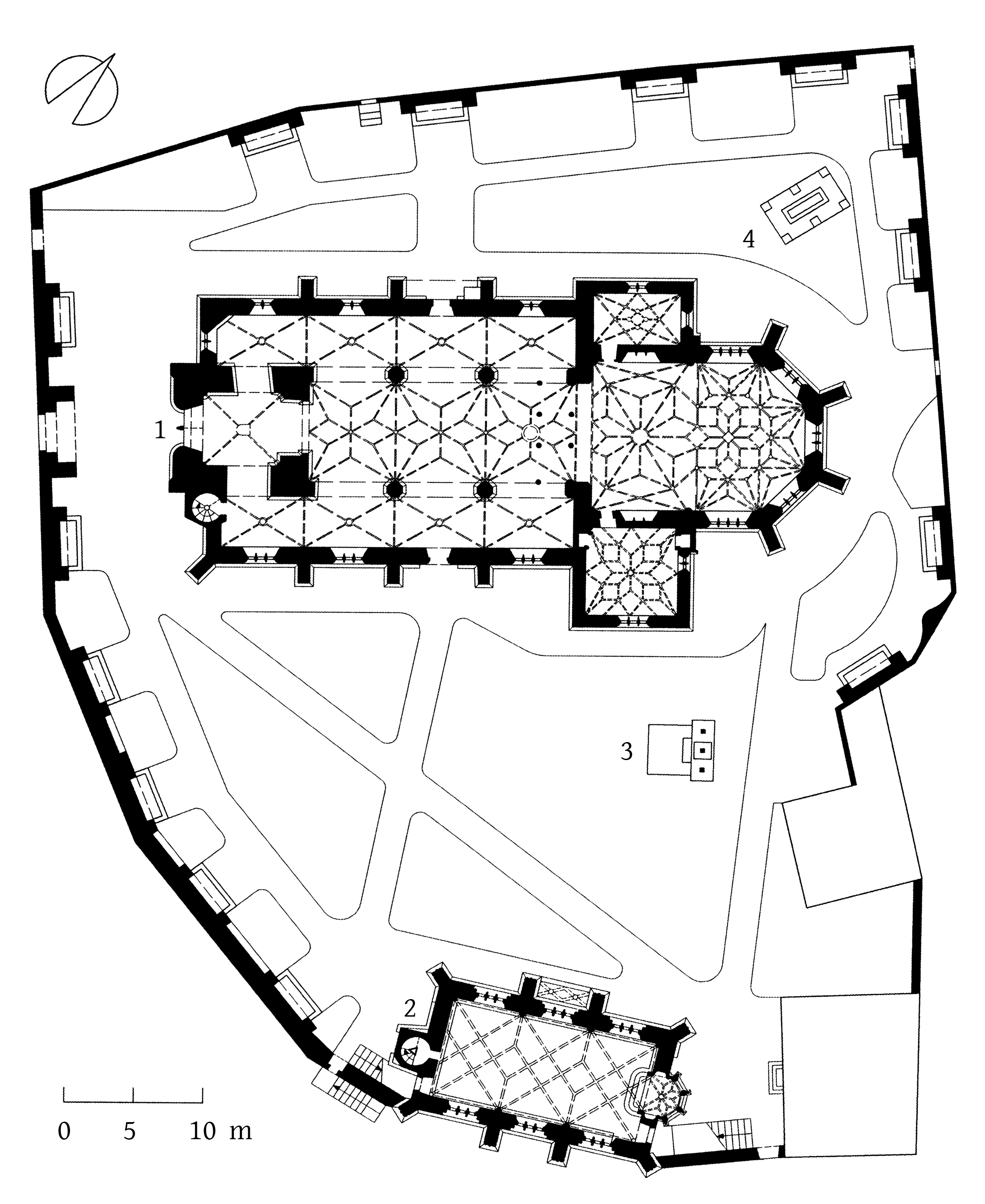
Church and chapel

=== Music ===
The organ in the parish church, with approximately 950 pipes, dates from the Late Gothic period, and is one of Germany’s oldest playable organs. The choir of boys and men (lately including girls), the Kiedricher Chorbuben, has, according to documents, been practicing a special Mainz choral dialect of liturgical Latin plainsong at services since 1333 dialect – the dialect is only preserved here. The choir performs a Latin mass most Sundays except during school vacations. Countertenor Andreas Scholl was a member of the choir, his sister Elisabeth Scholl was the first girl to be accepted.

The oldest bell dates from 1389. The Gothic architecture of the building is accompanied by the sound of that period in music and bells.

=== Events ===
- Champagnerfest (first Sunday in June, organizer: Freundschaftsbund Kiedrich-Hautvillers)
- Hahnwaldlauf (walk, early July, organizer: Turnerschaft Kiedrich)
- Adventsbasar (first day in Advent, organizer: local SPD club)
- Schnorrerrallye (Thursday before Ash Wednesday, organizer: Kiedricher Carneval Verein Sprudelfunken)
- Rosenmontagszug (parade, Shrove Monday, organizer: Kiedricher Carneval Verein Sprudelfunken)
- Mundartmatinée (first Sunday in August, organizer: Community of Kiedrich)
- Rheingau Musik Festival, usually a concert of sacred music in the church and a concert at Weingut Robert Weil
- Rieslingfest (Now in September (used to be June), organizer: Ausschuss Kiedricher Rieslingfest)

=== Landmarks ===
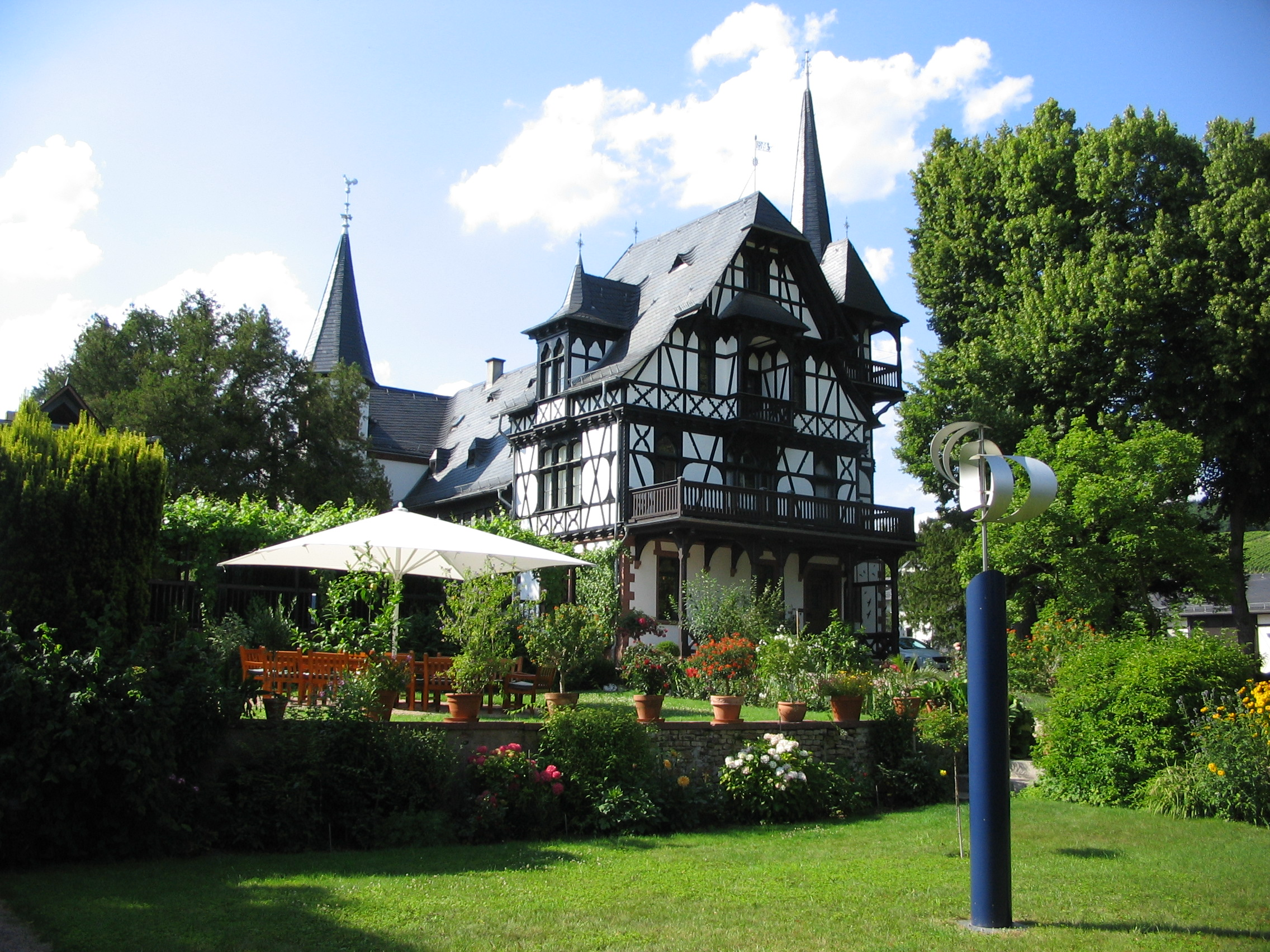
former villa of John Sutton and now Robert Weil wine estate

Owing to its Gothic churches, Kiedrich is also called Schatzkästlein der Gotik ("Little Treasure Chest of Gothic").

Landmarks are:

- The Catholic pilgrimage church consecrated to Saint Valentine – completed in 1493 – and the neighbouring Saint Michael's Chapel (Michaelskapelle) from 1444 with its ossuary and large two-sided candlestick Madonna (from about 1520)
- the Renaissance Town Hall dating from 1585
- at the churchyard wall is the oldest market well in the Rheingau, from 1541, with the coats of arms of Kiedrich and the old Mainz overlord, Elector and Cardinal Albrecht von Brandenburg.
- Burg Scharfenstein (castle, built about 1160, and in ruins since the 16th century) was part of Archiepiscopal Mainz's border fortifications. The tower (keep), which is still standing, with the Wheels of Mainz, has been borne as an emblem in the community seal from the time of the oldest known court seal of about 1420.
- The house of benefactor and patron Sir John Sutton's (1820–1873), which today is the Weil wine estate.
- Virchow-Quelle (spring), a 24° lithium-laden beneficial salt spring.

=== Twinning ===
- Hautvillers, Marne, France since 1981

== Economy ==
=== Winegrowing ===
High-grade wines are grown in Kiedrich. The vineyards (or 'Weinlagen') Gräfenberg, Wasseros, Klosterberg, Sandgrub and Turmberg, and the larger winegrowing area ('Großlage') Heiligenstock are said to be the Rheingau's top wines. The Kiedrich winemakers’ winegrowing tradition originates in the year 1480, when wine was already being grown by the winemaker's house that is still exists today, under the name 'Adelsgut Langenhof'. The local winemakers’ cooperative has existed since 1893, making it the oldest in the Rheingau.

=== Public institutions ===
St Valentinushaus, psychiatric hospital founded in 1884, today also a nursing home.

== Education ==
- Chorschule neben der Kirche, school endowed by Sir John Sutton in 1865 for vocal training and promotion of plainsong
- John-Sutton-Schule, primary school of the Rheingau-Taunus-Kreis: Jena plan school
- Integrative Kindertagesstätten "Hickelhäusje" und "St. Valentin": "wood" group
- secondary schools in Eltville am Rhein, Geisenheim and Wiesbaden.

== Notable people ==
- John Sutton (1820–1873), patron and endower of the choral school (1865)
- Anton Raky, oil drilling pioneer, grew up in Kiedrich and developed a special boring bit during his apprenticeship
- Gerson Stern, writer, lived from 1920 to 1937 in Kiedrich and wrote his novel Weg ohne Ende (1934) here.
- Andreas Scholl, countertenor, former Kiedrich choirboy (Kiedricher Chorbube), Kiedrich citizen
- Elisabeth Scholl, soprano, sister of Andreas Scholl, the first girl accepted in the boys choir Kiedricher Chorbuben
- Peter Grebert (1824-1895), businessman and wine grower, contributed to the establishment of a white wine tradition in Australia's Hunter Valley wine region.
