= Frank Stähle =

German musician (1942–2015)

- Frank Stahle, in the 1990s
- Born: 12 July 1942; Stuttgart
- Died: 10 December 2015 (aged 73); Frankfurt
- Occupations: Choral conductor; Conservatory director
- Organizations: Lutherkirche, Wiesbaden; Rheingauer Kantorei; Dr. Hoch's Konservatorium

Frank Stähle (12 July 1942 – 10 December 2015) was a German musician, a choral conductor and the director of Dr. Hoch's Konservatorium in Frankfurt from 1979 to 2007.

== Chorale conductor ==
Born in Stuttgart, Stähle went to schools in Hamburg and Wiesbaden where he received the Abitur in 1962. He studied church music in Frankfurt, including organ with Helmut Walcha, graduating in 1966. Stähle was the church musician (cantor and organist) at the Marienstiftskirche in Lich from 1966 to 1970, then at the Lutherkirche in Wiesbaden, the capital of Hesse.

He founded in 1977 the Rheingauer Kantorei, the choir of the Evangelisches Dekanat Wiesbaden-Rheingau (Protestant deanery Wiesbaden-Rheingau), merging two groups, the church choir of the Protestant parish in Geisenheim and singers from Wiesbaden. The purpose of the choir was to sing in church services of the region and to sing oratorios in concert. Main venues for the concerts were the Marktkirche in Wiesbaden and the Rheingauer Dom in Geisenheim. The groups rehearsed separately in Geisenheim and performed the concerts together.

In 1978 he conducted Handel's Messias, in the Rheingauer Dom and the Lutherkirche in Wiesbaden, and Ein deutsches Requiem by Johannes Brahms, in Geisenheim and the Marktkirche. In 1979 he conducted Bach's St Matthew Passion in St. Bonifatius, Wiesbaden, and in Worms, in a collaboration with the Wormser Kurrende. He performed Mendelssohn's Elias with the Radiosinfonieorchester Frankfurt, in Geisenheim and the Marktkirche. Erich Wenk performed the title role. A reviewer wrote in the FAZ that the choir carried the dramatic action with great expressiveness in extremely differentiated grades of colour and articulation, based on a sensitive reading of text and score.

In 1980 he conducted with the Geisenheim group Buxtehude's Membra Jesu Nostri in Geisenheim. He performed Honegger's König David in the Marktkirche, with the Radiosinfonieorchester Frankfurt, and soloists Klesie Kelly, Claudia Eder as both young David and the Witch of Endor, and Gerd Nienstedt as the narrator.

On 13 June 1981 he conducted Bruckner's Mass No. 2 in E minor for eight-part choir and brass. On 21 November 1981 he led the choir in a performance in the Marktkirche of Bach's Mass in B minor as part of the festival Vierte Wiesbadener Bachwochen (Fourth Wiesbaden Bach Weeks), organized by Martin Lutz. The reviewer Helmut Hampel of the Wiesbadener Kurier noted the large choir with many young singers, and described the tempos as "wahrhaft lebendig und erfüllt" (truly lively and appropriate), especially in the final movement Dona nobis pacem. He found Stähle's conducting style precise, not exaggerated and driven by inner tension ("genaue, unübertriebene und von innerer Spannung geprägte Zeichengebung".

== Dr. Hoch's Konservatorium ==
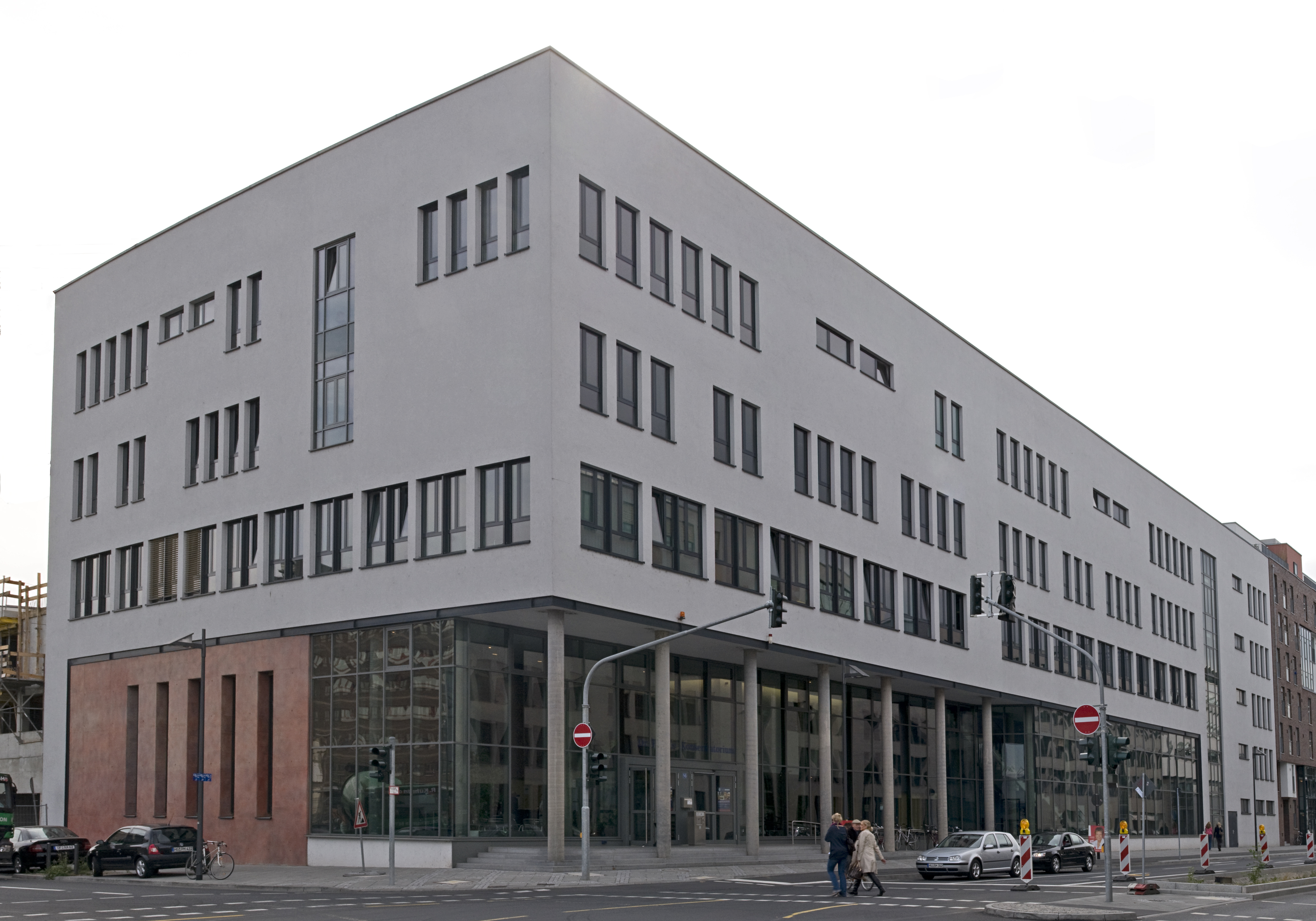
Dr. Hoch's Konservatorium – Musikakademie from 2005

Stähle was director of Dr. Hoch's Konservatorium from 1979 to 2007. The traditional institution in Frankfurt dates back to 1878. Among its instructors were Clara Schumann, Engelbert Humperdinck, later Theodor W. Adorno and Paul Hindemith. Stähle was instrumental in restoring the training of professional musicians. In 1981 the subjects voice, instruments, ballet and jazz were expanded by preparation classes for university studies, Early Music and Contemporary Music. In 1982 a seminary for musical critic and comparing interpretation ("vergleichende Interpretation") were added. Stähle revived choir and orchestra, and performed with them annually the anniversary of either birth or death of the founder. In 1986 he prepared the groups in rehearsals of half a year for performances of Bach's cantata Ich will den Kreuzstab gerne tragen, BWV 56, and Mozart's Requiem at four locations of the region, including the Lutherkirche which celebrated its centenary by inviting former church musicians to perform. A reviewer noted the good preparation, which formed an ensemble able to create an impressive intense atmosphere by great dynamic contrasts. The reviewer of the Frankfurter Allgemeine Zeitung noted the merits of instilling in the performers a personal relation to what they were doing, literally joy at work ("Freude am Werk").

From 1985 Dr. Hoch's Conservatory trained music teachers, who could graduate with the diploma "Staatliche Musiklehrerprüfung". In 1986 the conservatory began moving to a location in the center of Frankfurt, the Philanthropin, a former Jewish school. From 1995, a treaty of the Musikhochschule and the conservatory enables students from the conservatory to continue at the Hochschule (university). The conservatory gained the status of Musikakademie (Academy of Music) in 2002. A new building was opened in 2005, serving around 1000 students.

From 2010, Stähle helped as an organist at the Dreikönigskirche in Frankfurt. He died in Frankfurt and was buried in Wiesbaden.
