= Klesie Kelly =

American singer

- Born: 1946 (age 79–80); Kentucky, US
- Other name: Klesie Kelly-Moog
- Occupations: Soprano; Academic voice teacher
- Organization: Musikhochschule Köln

Klesie Kelly, or Klesie Kelly-Moog (born 1946), is an American soprano and voice teacher who studied and is based in Germany, performing concerts and teaching internationally. She was professor at the Musikhochschule Köln from 1986 to 2014, and has taught international master classes.

== Career ==
Born in Kentucky in 1946, Kelly studied voice at the Wisconsin University in Madison. She studied further in Germany with Bettina Björnsten and at the Musikhochschule Detmold with Helmut Kretschmar and Günther Weißenborn. More active in concert than on the opera stage, she has collaborated with conductors such as Moshe Atzmon, Wolfgang Gönnenwein, Erich Leinsdorf, Bruno Maderna and Hiroshi Wakasugi. She has performed in Europe and Japan.

In 1971, Kelly appeared at the Mozartsaal of the Konzerthaus in Vienna, singing Lieder by Purcell, Schubert and Strauss, among others, accompanied by Norman Shetler. She recorded songs by composers including Mozart, Schumann, Wolf and Zemlinsky with pianist Werner Genuit. In 1977, she recorded evening songs and love songs (Abendlieder, Liebeslieder und Romanzen) with tenor Ian Partridge, accompanied by instrumental soloists including Hermann Baumann (horn), Dieter Klöcker (clarinet), Karl-Otto Hartmann (bassoon) and again Genuit. The selection of rarely performed chamber music includes "Schlummerlied" (slumber song) by Benedict Randhartinger for soprano, tenor, horn and piano, Franz Lachner's "Seit ich ihn gesehen" (after Chamisso) for soprano, clarinet and piano, and his "Laute Liebe" (noisy love) for soprano, bassoon and piano.

In Wiesbaden's Marktkirche, she sang with the choir Rheingauer Kantorei, both in 1979 Mendelssohn's oratorio Elias with the Radiosinfonieorchester Frankfurt alongside Erich Wenk in the title part, and in 1980 Honegger's König David, with Claudia Eder as the young David and Gerd Nienstedt as the narrator.

=== Teaching ===
Kelly was professor of voice at the Musikhochschule Köln from 1986 to 2014. She has taught master classes in Europe and Korea. Her students have included Juan Carlos Echeverry, Julia Kleiter, Ulrike Maria Maier and Christiane Oelze. Several of her students were successful at international competitions and perform with leading opera companies. In 2013 her students took part in recorded lecture concerts of Bach's St Matthew Passion by Helmuth Rilling at the Musikhochschule Stuttgart as part of the Bachwoche Stuttgart; four concerts were given and filmed live.
