= Werner Genuit =

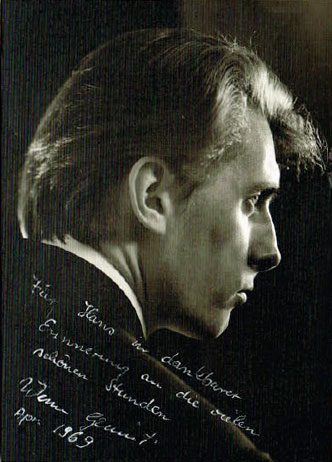
- Werner Genuit-1969
- Born: 3 June 1937; Wuppertal, Germany
- Died: 3 January 1997 (aged 59)
- Occupations: Classical pianist; Academic teacher
- Organizations: Musikhochschule Detmold; Musikhochschule Karlsruhe

Werner Genuit (3 June 1937 – 3 January 1997) was a German classical pianist, composer and teacher.

== Career ==
Born in Wuppertal, Genuit was first trained to be a baker. He then studied the piano at the Nordwestdeutsche Musikakademie, now the Hochschule für Musik Detmold, with Hans Richter-Haaser, and in Geneva with Louis Hiltbrand, where he graduated with a "Premier Prix à L'Unanimité".

He played concerts internationally as a soloist and chamber musician, with partners such as violinists Josef Suk, Tibor Varga and Wanda Wiłkomirska, cellists Anner Bylsma and André Navarra, speaker Hans Clarin, clarinetist Dieter Klöcker, whom he knew from childhood, and his ensemble Consortium Classicum. In 1976, he played the complete works for piano by Richard Wagner for the national congress of the Richard-Wagner-Verband in Nürnberg. He also made two tours through Southern Africa to audience acclaim. Genuit taught at today's Hochschule für Musik Detmold from 1970 to 1982, and was then professor for piano at the Hochschule für Musik Karlsruhe. The institute named a hall after him. He gave regular master classes in Weikersheim, Trossingen and Curitiba (Brazil).

== Recordings ==
Genuit made many recordings for record, broadcast (WDR and SWR) and TV. For the WDR, he recorded for example Alexander Zemlinsky's Clarinet Trio in D minor, Op. 3, with Klöcker (clarinet) and Helmar Stiehler (cello), broadcast again on 1 May 2014. He recorded Clarinet Chamber Music by Ferruccio Busoni with Klöcker and the Consortium Classicum. In 1977, he recorded evening songs and love songs (Abendlieder, Liebeslieder und Romanzen) with soprano Klesie Kelly. tenor Ian Partridge, and instrumental soloists including Hermann Baumann (horn), Klöcker (clarinet), and Karl-Otto Hartmann. He was awarded prizes such as the Premio della Critica Discografico Italiana and the Wiener Flötenuhr for the best interpretation of Mozart's works, among others.
