= Stahle =

Stahle (also Stähle, Ståhle, Štáhle) may refer to:

== People ==
- Andreas Stähle (born 1965), East German Olympian
- Axel Ståhle (1897–1987), Swedish Olympian
- Carl Ivar Ståhle (1913–1980), Swedish linguist and toponymist
- Daniel Stahle (born 1974), Bolivian Olympian
- Elisabeth Mengel-Stähle (born 1982), German politician
- Frank Stähle (1942–2015), German musician
- James Alonzo Stahle (1829–1912), American politician
- Louise Stahle (born 1965), Swedish golfer
- Stina Ståhle (1907–1971), Swedish actress
- Willy Stähle (1954–2015), Dutch Olympian

== Places ==
- Malá Štáhle, village in the Czech Republic
- Velká Štáhle, village in the Czech Republic

== See also ==
- Staehle
