= Rheingauer Kantorei =

German choir

- Mixed choir
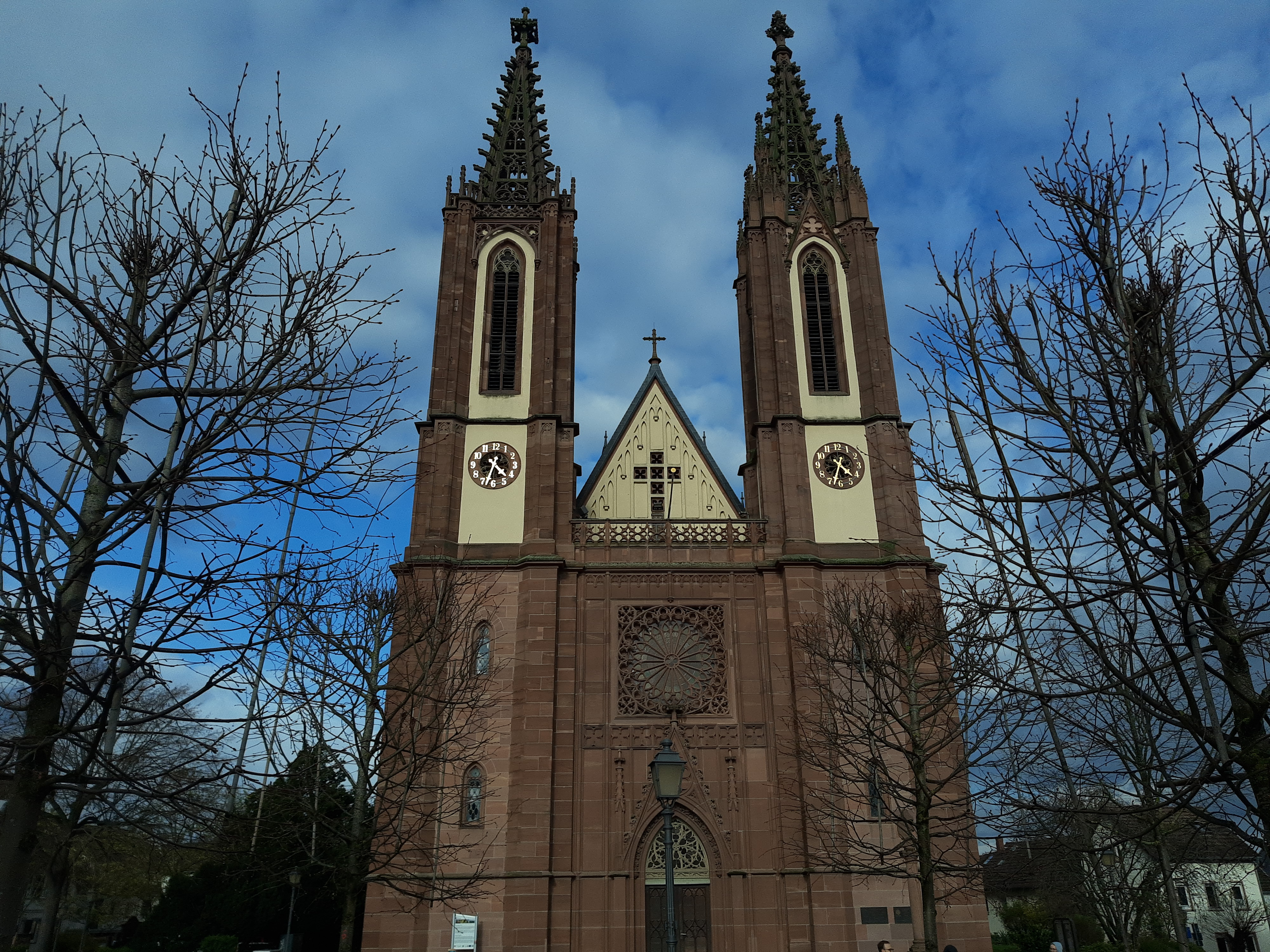
- Front of the Rheingauer Dom, a regular venue of the choir, 2013
- Origin: Geisenheim; Wiesbaden
- Founded: 1977
- Genre: Religious music
- Chief conductor: Frank Stähle; Horst Werner

Neue Rheingauer Kantorei
- Mixed choir
- Origin: Geisenheim
- Founded: 2002
- Genre: Religious music
- Chief conductor: Tassilo Schlenther

Rheingauer Kantorei (Rheingau chorale), now Neue Rheingauer Kantorei, is a mixed choir of the Rheingau region in Germany, performing mostly sacred music in services and concerts.

Interior of the Rheingauer Dom, 2013

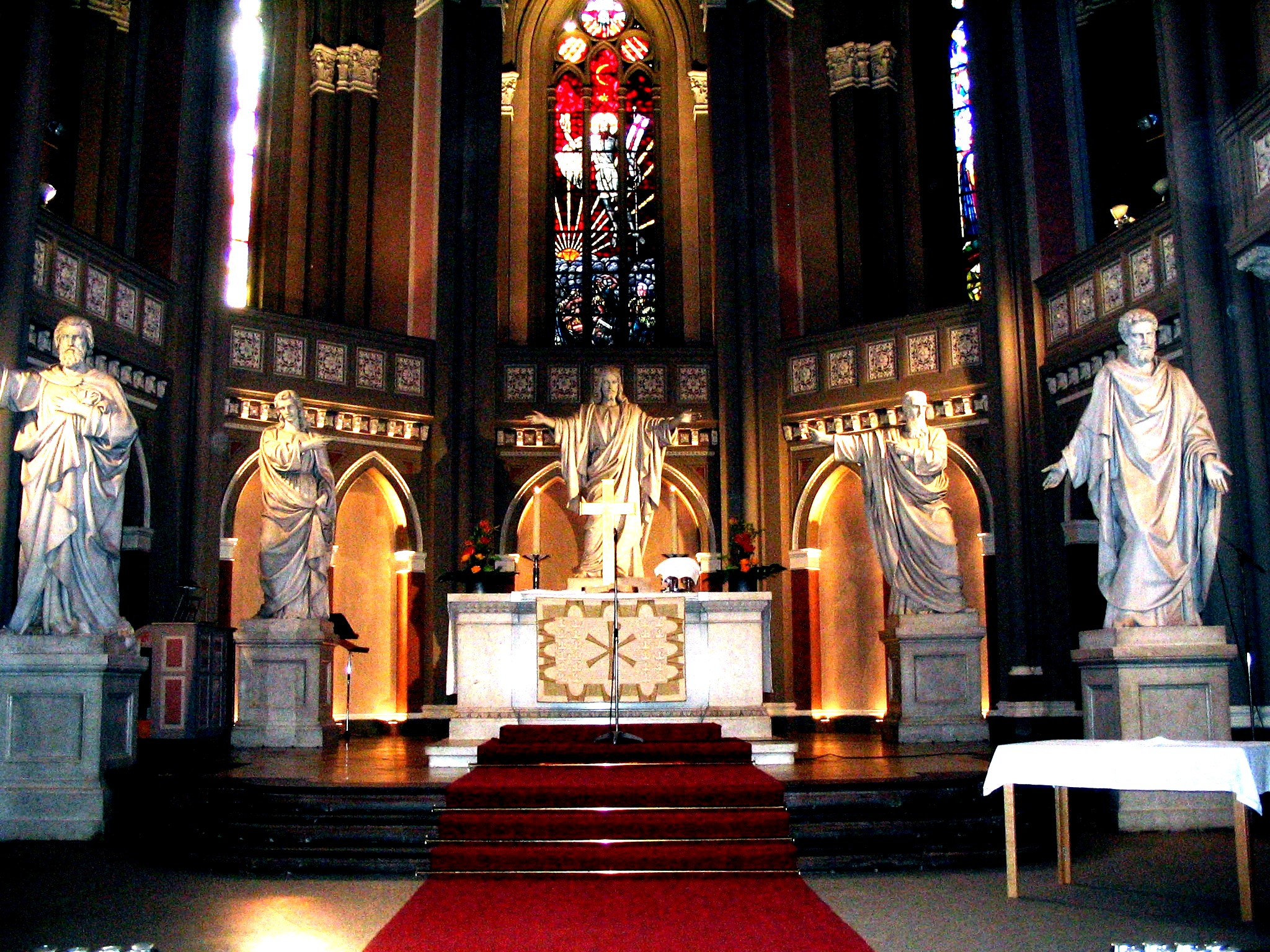
Interior of the Marktkirche in Wiesbaden

== Frank Stähle ==
The choir was founded in 1977 by Frank Stähle as the choir of the Evangelisches Dekanat Wiesbaden-Rheingau (Protestant deanery Wiesbaden-Rheingau), merging two groups, the church choir of the Protestant parish in Geisenheim and singers from Wiesbaden. The purpose of the choir was to sing in church services of the region and to sing oratorios in concert. Main venues for the concerts were the Marktkirche in Wiesbaden and the Rheingauer Dom in Geisenheim. The groups rehearsed separately in Geisenheim and Wiesbaden and then performed most of the concerts together.

In 1978, the choir performed Handel's Messias in the Rheingauer Dom and the Lutherkirche in Wiesbaden, and Ein deutsches Requiem by Johannes Brahms in Geisenheim and the Marktkirche.

In 1979, Bach's St Matthew Passion was performed in St. Bonifatius, Wiesbaden and in Worms, in a collaboration with the Wormser Kurrende (itinerant youth choir). Mendelssohn's Elias was performed with the Radiosinfonieorchester Frankfurt in Geisenheim and the Marktkirche. Erich Wenk sang the title part, Klesie Kelly the soprano parts.

In 1980, the Geisenheim group performed Buxtehude's Membra Jesu Nostri in Geisenheim. The complete group sang Honegger's König David in the Marktkirche, with the Radiosinfonieorchester Frankfurt, and soloists Klesie Kelly, Claudia Eder as both young David and the Witch of Endor, and Gerd Nienstedt as the narrator.

A concert on 13 June 1981 combined Palestrina's Missa Papae Marcelli, performed by selected voices under assistant conductor Horst Werner, and Bruckner's Mass No. 2 in E minor for eight-part choir and brass. On 21 November 1981, the choir performed in the Marktkirche Bach's Mass in B minor as part of the Vierte Wiesbadener Bachwochen (Fourth Wiesbaden Bach Weeks), organized by Martin Lutz.

== Horst Werner ==
Stähle, who was director of Dr. Hoch's Konservatorium from 1979, passed the choir to Horst Werner, who had studied at the Musikhochschule Frankfurt with Helmuth Rilling. He first conducted Haydn's Harmoniemesse and Bach's cantata Wachet! betet! betet! wachet! BWV 70, with Christoph Prégardien as a soloist. In 1983, excerpts from the Psalmen Davids by Schütz were combined with Mozart's Vesperae de Dominica. In a second concert, the group sang Schubert's Mass No. 6 in E-flat major.

In 1985, the choir performed Karol Szymanowski's Stabat Mater and Leoš Janáček' Glagolitic Mass with organist Elisabeth Maranca and the Philharmonie Südwestfalen.

In 1986, the choir used the balconies of the Marktkirche to perform several settings of the Magnificat, including some polychoral compositions, followed by a concert of Mozart's Requiem with the Folkwang Kammerorchester Essen. Helmut Hampel reported for the Wiesbadener Kurier that the Dies irae was shattering and Confutatis of eerie density.

In 1987, the choir performed the second of the four versions of Bach's St John Passion, as the opening of four Passion compositions by four Wiesbaden-based choirs, including Bach's St Matthew Passion with the Schiersteiner Kantorei. Hampel noted in a review that Werner, also a musicologist, supplied solid historic background for the second version in the program notes and a preceding lecture, and that he managed to fill the turba choruses with energy, in diction and even more in dramatic expression. A second concert presented the Mass in A major by César Franck, and in a third concert Bruckner's Mass No. 3 in F minor, again with the Folkwang Kammerorchester.

== Tassilo Schlenther – Neue Rheingauer Kantorei ==
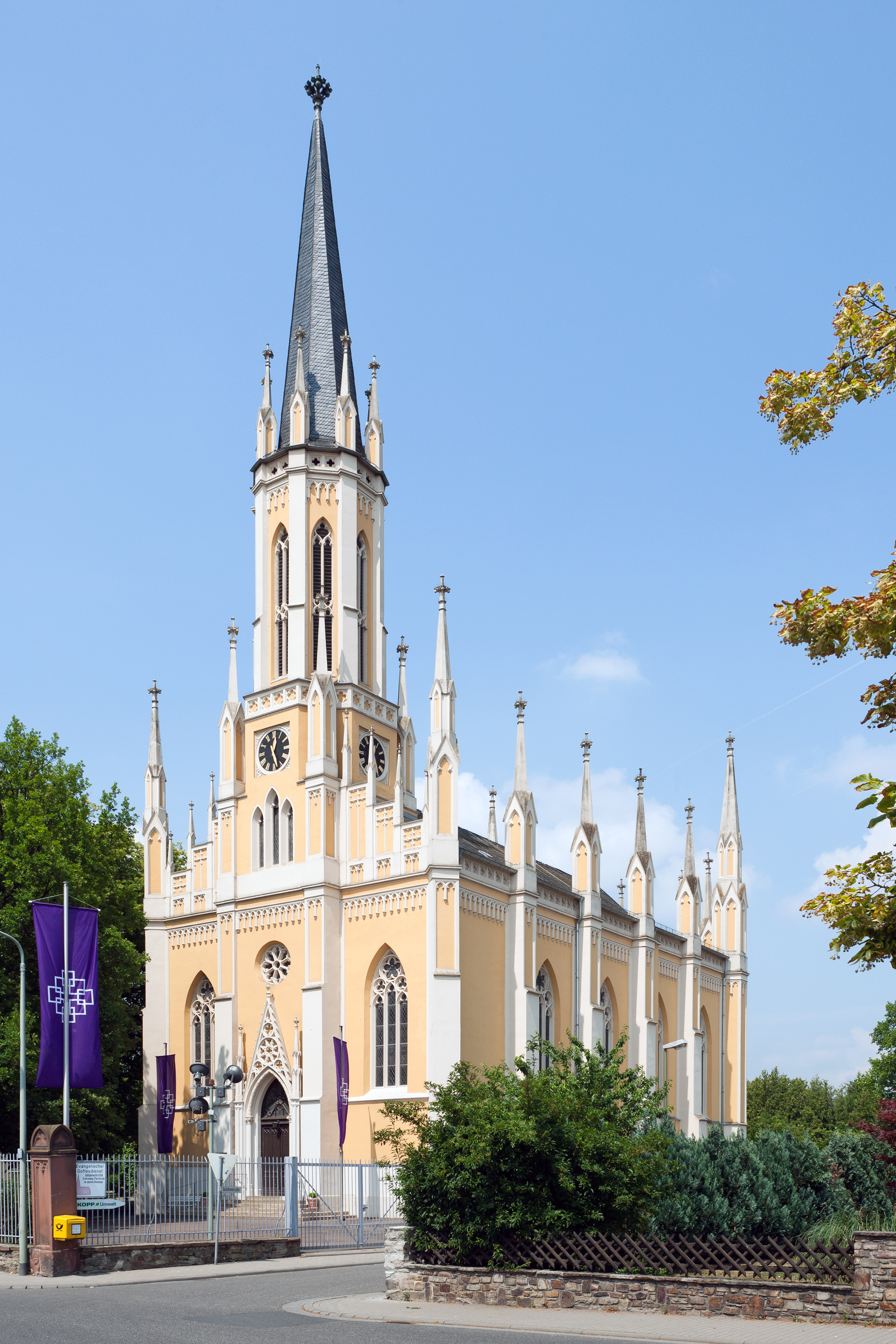
Johanneskirche, Erbach

A new choir, building on the tradition, was founded by Tassilo Schlenther in 2002, again expanding the choir of the Geisenheim protestantic parish. Venues for concerts have been the Rheingauer Dom, the basilica of Schloss Johannisberg, the basilica of Mittelheim, the Protestant church in Geisenheim and the Johanneskirche, Erbach.

The group, not yet under the name, collaborated with the choirs of St. Martin, Idstein, performing in 1996 Rutter's Magnificat, in 1999 Puccini's Messa di Gloria and in 2001 Rutter's Requiem and Britten's The Company of Heaven for speakers, soloists, chorus and orchestra, all performed both in Idstein and Johannisberg. In 2009, the Neue Rheingauer Kantorei performed Haydn's Die Schöpfung with soloists Elisabeth Scholl, Daniel Sans and Andreas Pruys. Services included an Easter Vigil in Eberbach Abbey in 2013. The choir participated in a television portrait of the Hessischer Rundfunk about the Rheingau region by Günter Wewel, in the series Kein schöner Land. A concert in 2014, performed in the Geisenheim Protestant church, was dedicated to contemporary Scandinavian music including works by Ola Gjeilo and Knut Nystedt. 2014 also saw a remarkable performance of Verdi's Requiem. A reviewer noted the choir's flexibility to sing different styles of music.
