= Schmalfuss =

Schmalfuss (also given as Schmalfuß) is a surname and may apply to:

- Albin Schmalfuß, whose drawings of mushrooms, first published in 1897, are frequently reprinted
- Conny Schmalfuss, a German diver
- Gernot Schmalfuß, oboist, member of Consortium Classicum, and director of the Evergreen Symphony Orchestra
- Lothar Schmalfuss, claimed by one author to be the actual name of Muhammad
- Peter Schmalfuss, a German classical pianist
