= Erich Wenk =

- Born: 12 August 1923; Königsberg, Germany
- Died: 30 March 2012 (aged 88); Lohmar, Germany
- Occupation: Classical bass-baritone
- Organization: Musikhochschule Köln

Erich Wenk (12 August 1923 – 30 March 2012) was a German bass-baritone singer in opera and especially in concert. He was a professor of voice at the Musikhochschule Köln.

== Career ==
Wenk was born in Königsberg. In 1957 he performed the Liebesliederwalzer by Johannes Brahms on a tour through Germany with Erna Berger, Gertrude Pitzinger and Walther Ludwig. He recorded the part of Don Fernando in Beethoven's Fidelio for the NDR, conducted by Carl Bamberger, with Gladys Kuchta and Julius Patzak in leading roles. In 1960, he sang the part of nobleman from Genova in a recording of Franz Schreker's Die Gezeichneten of the NDR, with Thomas Stewart and Evelyn Lear in leading roles, conducted by Winfried Zillig. In 1967, he recorded Georg Philipp Telemann's Pimpinone with the Bach-Collegium Stuttgart, alongside Yvonne Ciannella.

Wenk appeared in oratorios such as Haydn's Die Schöpfung and Ein Deutsches Requiem by Brahms, performed by the Städtischer Musikverein Gütersloh and the Nordwestdeutsche Philharmonie in 1959, conducted by Mattias Büchel. In 1967 he sang in Frank Martin's In terra pax, in 1968 in Bach's Christmas Oratorio. In 1979, he performed the title role of Mendelssohn's Elias with the Rheingauer Kantorei and the Radiosinfonieorchester Frankfurt, in the Rheingauer Dom in Geisenheim and the Marktkirche Wiesbaden, alongside soprano Klesie Kelly.

Wenk is regarded as a specialist for the works of Johann Sebastian Bach. He recorded Bach cantatas with Fritz Werner and Helmuth Rilling, among others. In a 1966 recording of the dramma per musica Preise dein Glücke, gesegnetes Sachsen, BWV 215, he performed the rage aria Rase nur, verwegner Schwarm. Wenk recorded Bach's Mass in B minor in 1956/59 with the Schwäbischer Singkreis Stuttgart, conducted by Hans Grischkat. He sang the bass part in Bach's St Matthew Passion in a live recording conducted by Ljubomir Romansky at the Salle Pleyel, with Josef Traxel as the Evangelist and Helmut Fehn as the vox Christi.

From 1969, Wenk was professor of voice at the Musikhochschule Köln. He died in Lohmar.
