= Elsa Cavelti =

Swiss opera singer (1907–2001)

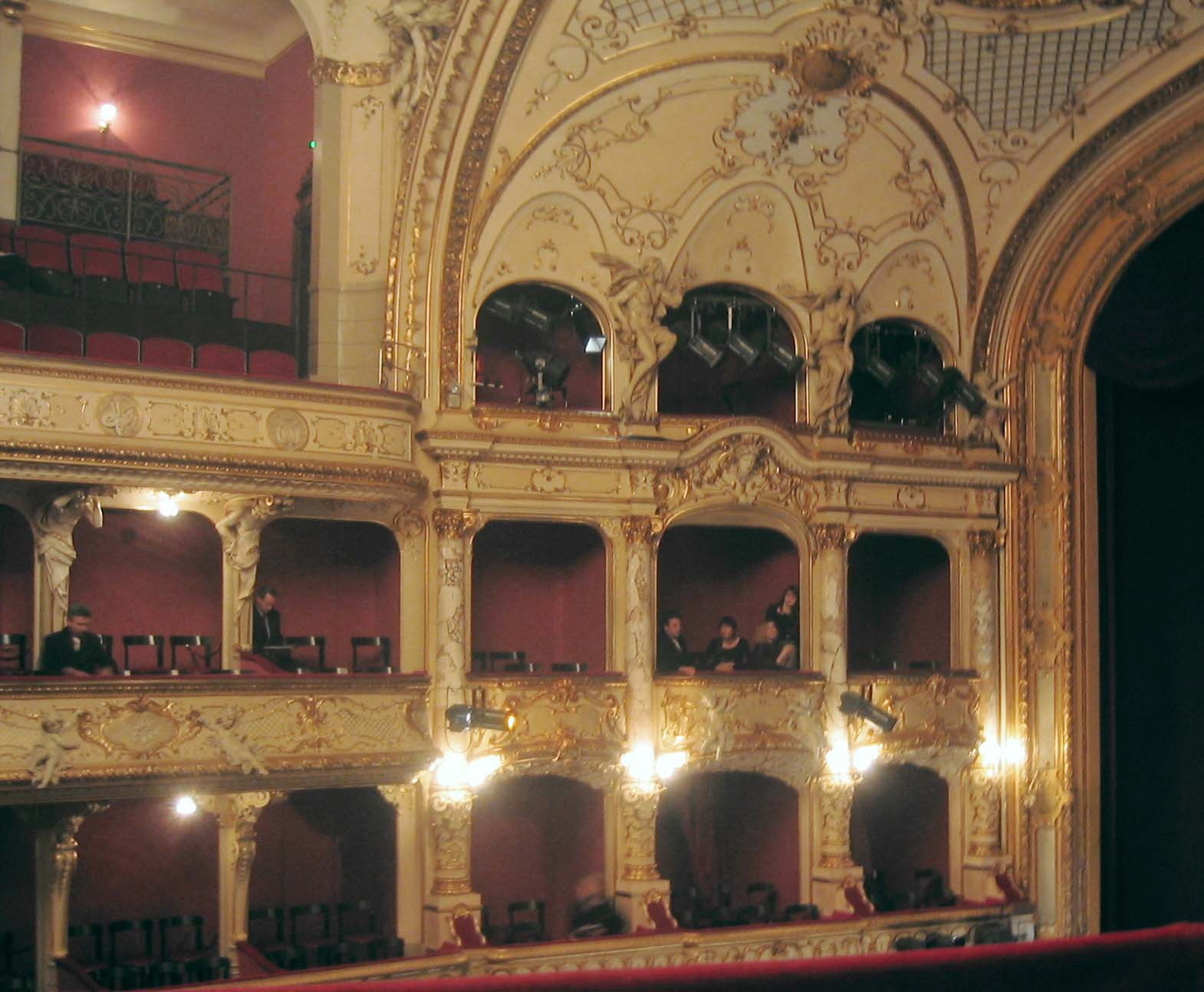
- Interior of the Opernhaus Zürich, where the singer was a leading dramatic contralto from 1944
- Born: 4 May 1907; Rorschach, Switzerland
- Died: 10 August 2001 (aged 94); Basel, Switzerland
- Occupations: Operatic contralto, mezzo-soprano and soprano; Academic voice teacher
- Organizations: Opernhaus Zürich; Musikhochschule Frankfurt

Elsa Cavelti (4 May 1907 – 10 August 2001) was a Swiss operatic contralto and mezzo-soprano, temporarily also a dramatic soprano, who worked at German and Swiss opera houses and as an international guest. She was an academic voice teacher in Frankfurt.

== Career ==
Born in Rorschach, Switzerland, Cavelti trained her voice first in Zürich, then in Frankfurt with Res Fischer, and in Vienna with Otto Iro. She made her stage debut in 1936 at the Stadttheater Kattowitz and moved to the Frankfurt Opera in 1938. She continued her career in Oberschlesischen Landestheater in Beuthen from 1939 to 1942 and Opernhaus Düsseldorf from 1942 to 1944. She appeared as a guest at the Semperoper in 1939.

In 1944, she returned to Switzerland, singing as the leading dramatic contralto at the Opernhaus Zürich. She appeared as Brangäne in Wagner's Tristan und Isolde, as Fricka in his Die Walküre, as Ortrud in his Lohengrin, and in the title role (Octavian) of Der Rosenkavalier by Richard Strauss, among others. In 1949, she took part in the premiere of Willy Burkhard's Die schwarze Spinne. The same year, she performed in Monteverdi's L'incoronazione di Poppea, both at Vicenza's Teatro Olimpico and at La Fenice in Venice. She performed as a guest at La Scala in Milan several times, including Octavian, Brangäne, Venus in Wagner's Tannhäuser, and the title role of Arthur Honegger's Judith. She appeared as a guest at the Vienna State Opera, in Belgium, France, United Kingdom, in Argentina, and the US.

In 1959, she studied to be a dramatic soprano. Her roles included the title role of Beethoven's Fidelio, Brünnhilde in Wagner's Der Ring des Nibelungen, and the Marschallin in Der Rosenkavalier. She appeared at the 1966 Bayreuth Festival as the second Norn in Wagner's Götterdämmerung.

Cavelti was also an oratorio and Lieder singer. She sang in 1945 in the premiere of Frank Martin's Weise von Liebe und Tod des Cornets Christoph Rilke, and sang several songs by Othmar Schoeck for the first time. Cavelti was an influential academic voice teacher. From 1970, she taught at the Musikhochschule Frankfurt and later in Basel. Among her students are Claudia Eder, Eva Lind, Gabriele Schnaut, Ortrun Wenkel and Ruth Ziesak. She died in Basel.

In October 1954 she recorded Robert Oboussier's Antigone (recitative, aria and elegy after Sophocles) with Orchestre de la Suisse Romande conducted by Ernest Ansermet (Decca LXT 5097).
