= Staehle =

Staehle may refer to:

- 3875 Staehle, main-belt asteroid

== Surnames ==
- Marv Staehle (born 1942), American former Major League Baseball second baseman
- Wolfgang Staehle (born 1950), American artist
- Hugo Staehle (1826–1848), German composer

== See also ==
- Stahle (disambiguation)
