= Gertrude Pitzinger =

German contralto

- Gertrude Pitzinger, in the 1940s
- Born: 15 August 1904; Mährisch-Schönberg, Austria-Hungary
- Died: 15 September 1997 (aged 93); Frankfurt, Germany
- Education: Vienna Music Academy
- Occupations: Classical contralto; Academic teacher
- Organizations: Salzburg Festival; Musikhochschule Hannover; Musikhochschule Frankfurt
- Awards: Sudetendeutscher Kulturpreis

Gertrude Pitzinger (15 August 1904 – 15 September 1997) was a German contralto appearing in concert, especially singing Lieder. She taught at the music universities of Hannover and Frankfurt.

== Career ==
Born in Mährisch-Schönberg, then in Austria-Hungary, Pitzinger studied in Vienna at the Musikakademie. She graduated in 1926 as music teacher. She studied singing Lieder with Julia Culp, and then moved to Reichenberg (now Liberec, Czech Republic), where she performed in oratorios and in concerts. A first recital of Lieder at the Berliner Singakademie brought her wider recognition. She performed in Hans Pfitzners Von deutscher Seele. Wilhelm Furtwängler performed with her as a soloist in London in 1937.

She toured in several European countries, and in the United States in 1938 and 1939. Hubert Giesen accompanied her in recitals, including at Carnegie Hall and the New York Town Hall. In England, the United States, and Canada, she became known as "the German Lieder singer". She often collaborated with conductors such as Ferenc Fricsay, Eugen Jochum, Joseph Keilberth, Egon Kornauth and Fritz Rieger. In 1940 she performed in the premiere of Franz Schmidt's cantata Deutsche Auferstehung in the Musikverein in Vienna, conducted by Oswald Kabasta. In 1957 he performed the Liebesliederwalzer by Johannes Brahms on a tour through Germany with Erna Berger, Walther Ludwig and Erich Wenk. In 1960 she recorded Mozart's Requiem with Elisabeth Grümmer, Helmut Krebs and Hans Hotter, conducted by Ferenc Fricsay.

She appeared regularly at the Salzburg Festival, singing in 1934 in Dvořák's Stabat Mater, and from 1951 to 1959 in Mozart's Requiem. In 1953, she appeared in Handel's Judas Maccabaeus, conducted by Joseph Messner, alongside Tilla Briem, Lorenz Fehenberger and Oskar Czerwenka. From 1955 to 1957 she performed in Beethoven's Missa Solemnis and until 1960 in masses by Haydn.

From 1956 Pitzinger held a master class for voice at the Musikhochschule Hannover. In 1960 she was appointed professor of voice at the Musikhochschule Frankfurt, where she taught until 1973.

== Awards ==
- 1957 Sudetendeutscher Kulturpreis
