= Friedrich-Wilhelm Tebbe =

German conductor, singer, and organist

Friedrich-Wilhelm Tebbe (born 31 May 1945) in Rotenburg an der Wümme, Germany, is a German conductor, singer, and organist. He studied voice at Hochschule für Musik, Theater und Medien Hannover with Otto Köhler.

Tebbe concentrated on studying lyric baritone roles such as Figaro (The Barber of Seville) and Papageno (The Magic Flute) which he subsequently performed on stage. After qualifying as a music teacher and voice instructor, he studied conducting with Felix Prohaska in Hanover and later at the University of Mainz with Sergiu Celibidache. As principal conductor of the Schaumburger Märchensänger (Obernkirchen Children's Choir) from 1980 to 1994, Tebbe was the leading force behind several bestselling recordings of the choir, which sold millions of copies worldwide.

As conductor and co-founder of the Bückeburger Bach-Orchester, he is known reviving the symphonies by Johann Christoph Friedrich Bach, several of which were recorded for the first time by the orchestra. Tebbe performed in most of the world's leading concert halls and has an extensive discography. He has appeared in over fifty German television broadcasts.

== Recordings ==
Tebbe's discography includes:

- Missa brevis C-Dur, KV 220 Spatzenmesse / Wolfgang Amadeus Mozart, Salve Regina g-moll, à quattro voci ma soli / Joseph Haydn. Schaumburger Kantorei Bergkirchen, Niedersächsisches Staatsorchester Hannover, Weisse, Gottfried [Org].
- Hermann Prey, Gerda Kosbahn und Theo Altmeyer singen Bach-Kantaten. Nun komm, der Heiden Heiland, Kantate BWV 61. Du Friedefürst, Herr Jesu Christ, Choral aus d. Kantate BWV 67. Der Friede sei mit dir, Kantate BWV 158.Schaumburger Märchensänger, Schaumburger Kantorei Bergkirchen, Niedersächsisches Staatsorchester, Hannover, Leuenhagen und Paris /Schwann 2891 231, FOX Records 2130027
- Die Schaumburger Märchensänger singen deutsche Volkslieder, Hamburger Symphoniker Europa 11698 / BMG 74321 25919 2
- Lerchengesang Schaumburger Märchensänger singen Chorlieder der Romantik, Siegfried Schick [Piano], Schaumburger Märchensänger, Leuenhagen und Paris 2782 (1989)
- Konzert in der alten Residenz Bückeburg (Werke von W. A. Mozart und Joh. Chr. Fr. Bach), Le nozze di Figaro - Ouvertüre. Konzert für Flöte, Harfe C-Dur KV 299. Wolfgang Amadeus Mozart. - Sinfonie B-Dur, W. I, 20 / Johann Christoph Friedrich Bach. Konhäuser, Ruth [Hf]. Martin, Peter [Fl]. Bückeburger Bach-Orchester, Leuenhagen und Paris Nr.203481[1992/2004]
- Konzertante Sinfonien am Hof zu Bückeburg, Werke von Joh. Chr. Friedri. Bach, Cimarosa und Mozart, Bückeburger Bach-Orchester, Leuenhagen und Paris (Nr. 2222118) 1994
- Künstler musizieren für die Dresdner Kreuzkirche, Werke von J.S. Bach und W.A. Mozart (Haffner-Sinfonie Kv 385) Bückeburger Bach-Orchester, NewArt Dresden 9601505 (1996)
- Stefan Milenkovich spielt Mozart, KV 219, KV 365, Bückeburger Bach - Orchester, FOX Records 2122022 (1997)
- Serenade im Schloss Bückeburg: Mozart Violinkonzerte KV 216, KV 219, David Tebbe-, Stefan Milenkovich - Violine, Bückeburger Bach - Orchetser, Musicom - Münster 050416 (2008)
- Große Musik in der Residenz Bückeburg, Werke von Joh. Chr. Friedr. Bach, G. Rossini, W. Kienzl, Richard Sahla, L.v. Beethoven, David Tebbe - Violine, Schaumburger Märchensänger, Bückeburger Bach-Orchester
