= Otto Köhler =

German baritone

Otto Köhler (25 June 1903 – 1 April 1976) was a German operatic baritone and voice teacher.

== Life ==
Born in Neu-Isenburg, Köhler, like his cousin, the tenor Franz Völker, first completed an apprenticeship at Disconto-Bank in Frankfurt, where he subsequently worked as a bank clerk. Like Franz Völker, he was a member of the Gesangverein Frohsinn – Sängerbund 1834 Neu-Isenburg and also had singing lessons with Alexander Wellig-Bertram, who had also trained the baritone Heinrich Schlusnus. Clemens Krauss engaged Köhler in 1928 as a lyrical baritone beginner at the Oper Frankfurt, where Köhler sang Silvio in Leoncavallo's Pagliacci.

After working at the Cologne Opera House under Eugen Szenkar, the Ulm City Theatre under Herbert von Karajan and Koblenz, he was engaged in 1937 by the intendant and general music director Rudolf Krasselt at the Staatsoper Hannover as first lyrical baritone. He remained loyal to this house and was a guest performer until 1969. From 1947 on, he taught at the Hochschule für Musik, Theater und Medien Hannover until his death there in 1976 at the age of 72.

== Career ==
Köhler had a pleasantly sonorous, lyrical baritone voice, which developed into a character baritone as he grew older. His talent and wit made him a paradigm actor of Rossini's The Barber of Seville, a role he has sung over 200 times and with which he has performed in Berlin, Düsseldorf, Hamburg and Cologne. He also sang Papageno in Mozart's The magic flute, and - with the exception of the hero baritone part - almost all baritone parts except Mozart's Don Giovanni and Count Almaviva in Le nozze di Figaro. These two roles, for which his stature seemed less suitable, he often managed to escape with success by cunningly recommending his Berlin colleagues Karl Schmitt-Walter at the Intendance as guests for Don Giovanni or the Count. In return, the latter was only too happy to let him have the Rossini-Figaro in Berlin. At the age of 70, he still sang Prince Ottokar in Weber's Der Freischütz.

Köhler worked as a singing teacher at the University of Music and Theatre. He repeatedly refused to be awarded the title of "Professor". He had learned his working attitude from Herbert von Karajan. Core sentences taken over from him, such as "Can't do, doesn't exist! What you cannot do, you have to work for", or "What is the first duty of a teacher and leader? To make oneself superfluous!" - determined the progress of his teaching activities. He gave his students the tools to be independent singers, so that in case of problems they could always rely first on the basic rules of what they had learned. He taught beginners seven days a week, only to reduce the frequency of his lessons to the number of compulsory lessons in the course of time.

Seven singers with the title Kammersänger have been initiated or vocally coached by Köhler, the singers Joan Carroll, Ruth-Margret Pütz, Margarete Berg, Elisabeth Pack and Gerd Nienstedt, Siegfried Haertel and Barr Peterson. The baritones Leonhard Delany, Tonio Larisch, Georg Schulz, Manfred Ball, Reinhard Braun and the tenors Horst Hoffmann as well as Joachim Siemann were also instructed in singing by him. Several later university professors received their vocal training from Köhler: Manfred Ball, Günter Binge, Gerd Nienstedt, Friedrich-Wilhelm Tebbe and Michael Temme, and the concert and opera singers Christine Reil, Heike Henkel, Dieter Miserre and Ulf Kenklies.

Most of Köhler's male pupils had come from the Knabenchor Hannover, whose male voices he supervised vocally. Among them was Gerry Schmidt, who later directed both the extra choir of the Staatsoper Hannover and its children's choir. Thus, Köhler, both himself and through his pupils, shaped the sound of the Hanoverian opera ensemble, the aforementioned choirs under Gerry Schmidt, the Hanoverian Boys' Choir and the Schaumburg Fairytale Singers by F.-W. Tebbe.
