= Marianne Schech =

German opera singer (1914–1999)

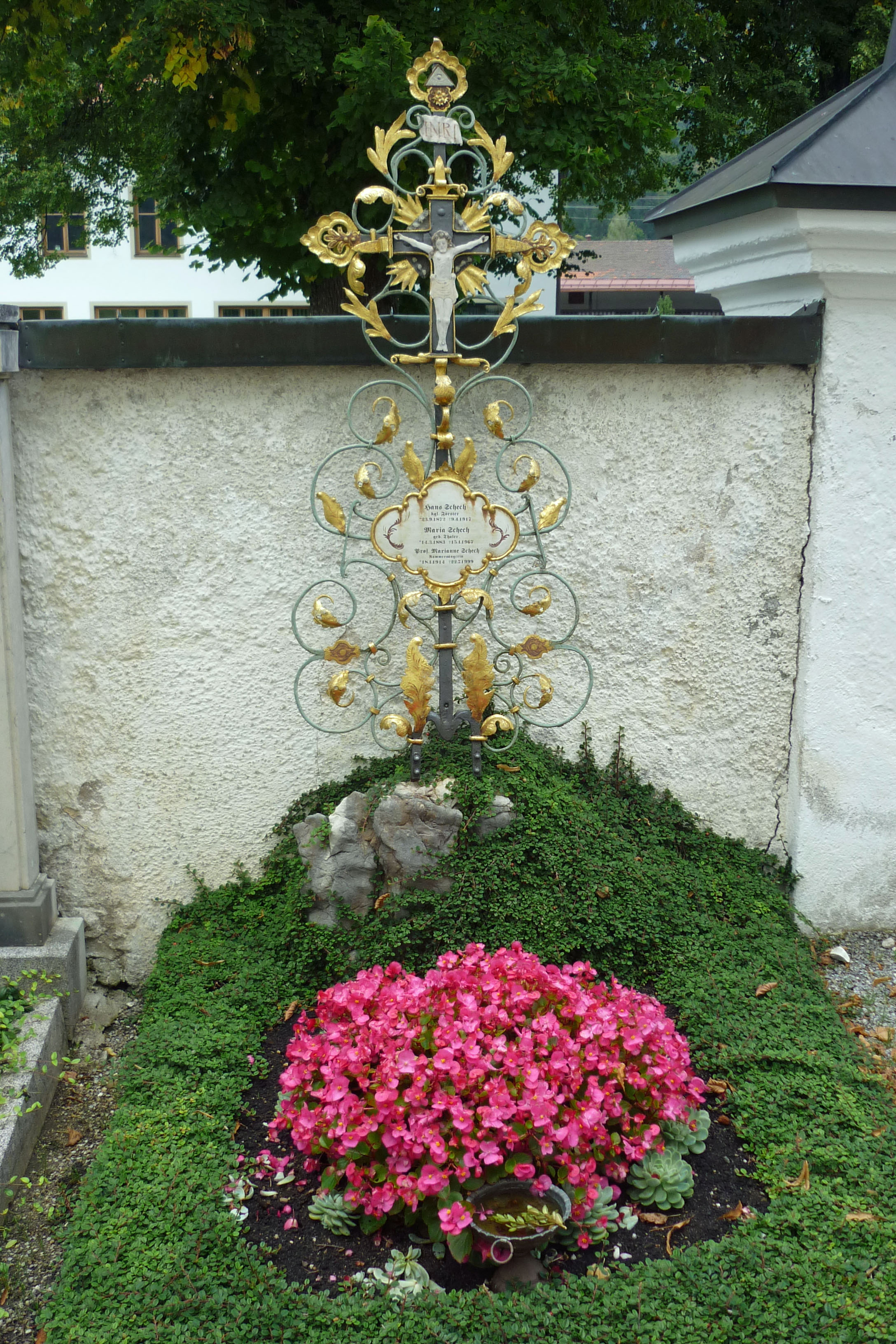
- Grave in the cemetery of Bayrischzell
- Born: 18 January 1914; Geitau near Bayrischzell, Bavaria, Germany
- Died: 22 July 1999 (aged 85); Munich, Bavaria, Germany
- Education: Trapp'sches Konservatorium; Akademie der Tonkunst
- Occupations: Operatic soprano; Academic voice teacher
- Organizations: Bavarian State Opera; Musikhochschule München

Marianne Schech (18 January 1914 – 22 July 1999) was a German operatic soprano and academic who appeared internationally. She was a member of the Bavarian State Opera from 1946 to 1970. She is known for leading roles in works by Richard Wagner and Richard Strauss, playing, for example, the Dyer's Wife in the U.S. premiere of Die Frau ohne Schatten by Richard Strauss at the San Francisco Opera in 1959. She made several recordings, including in 1951 the role of Elisabeth in Wagner's Tannhäuser, conducted by Robert Heger, in 1960 the role of Chrysothemis in Elektra by Richard Strauss, conducted by Karl Böhm, Senta in Wagner's Der fliegende Holländer, conducted by Franz Konwitschny, and Venus in Tannhäuser, also conducted by Konwitschny.

== Career ==
Born in Geitau near Bayrischzell, Schech studied at the Trapp'sches Konservatorium and at the Akademie der Tonkunst in Munich. She made her operatic debut at the Stadttheater Koblenz in 1937 in the role of Martha in d'Albert's Tiefland. In 1939, she moved to the Theater Münster, and in 1941 to the Düsseldorf Opera.

After World War II, Schech was a member of the Bavarian State Opera from 1946 to 1970. In 1952, she appeared in Rio de Janeiro as Senta in Wagner's Der fliegende Holländer and as Isolde in his Tristan und Isolde. In 1957, she was the Dyer's Wife in Die Frau ohne Schatten by Richard Strauss at the Paris Opera. She often appeared at the Vienna State Opera, in 1958 as Venus in Wagner's Tannhäuser and as Brünnhilde in his Siegfried, in 1962 as Brünnhilde in his Die Walküre and as the Marschallin in Der Rosenkavalier by Strauss. In 1959, she appeared as the Dyer's Wife in the U.S. premiere of the opera at the San Francisco Opera in 1959.

Schech made several recordings, including in 1951 the role of Elisabeth in Wagner'sTannhäuser, conducted by Robert Heger. She recorded the role of Sieglinde in Die Walküre, Martha in Tiefland, the Marschallin and the Dyer's Wife, among others. In 1960, she recorded the role of Chrysothemis in Elektra by Richard Strauss, conducted by Karl Böhm with the Staatskapelle Dresden, and alongside Inge Borkh in the title role and Dietrich Fischer-Dieskau as Orest. That same year, she recorded Senta in Der fliegende Holländer, conducted by Franz Konwitschny with the Staatskapelle Berlin, and alongside Dietrich Fischer-Dieskau in the title role, Gottlob Frick as Daland and Fritz Wunderlich as the Steuermann. Later in 1960, she again joined Konwitschny, the Staatskapelle Berlin, Fischer-Dieskau, Frick, and Wunderlich to record Tannhäuser with Hans Hopf in the title role and Elisabeth Grümmer as Elisabeth.

Schech lectured at the Musikhochschule München from 1970, where Claudia Eder and Felicity Palmer were among her students. She died in Munich in 1999.
