= Philipp Hoffmann (architect) =

German architect and builder (1806–1889)

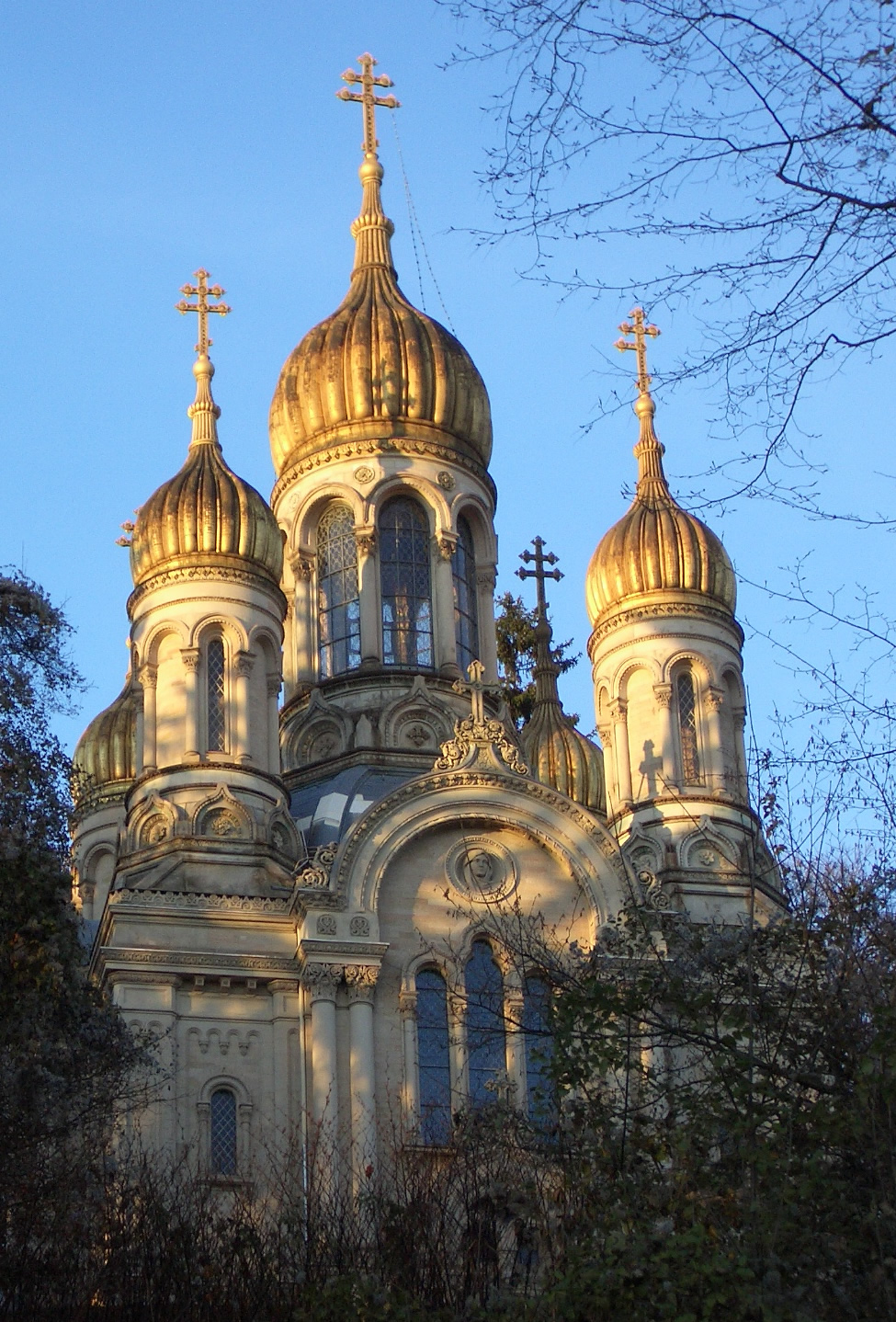
Hoffmann's Russian Church (1847-1855) on the Neroberg in Wiesbaden

Philipp Hoffmann (23 November 1806 – 3 January 1889) was a German architect and builder, principally known for his work in the Nassau capital in Wiesbaden.

== Life ==
Hoffmann was born in Geisenheim. In 1830 he was a building assessor in the Nassau Civil Service. As a young architect, his first design for the Neo-Gothic expansion of the Rheingauer Dom in his birthplace of Geisenheim (1834-1838), followed by involvement in the design of the Stadtschloss in Wiesbaden (1837-1841) - he was sent to Pompeii for six months by his architect Georg Moller, where he drew Roman paintings later used as the basis for the Stadtschloss's interior.

These projects gained the attention of William, Duke of Nassau, who promoted him to court architect of Nassau in 1850. In that role he designed several buildings in Wiesbaden, including St. Bonifatius (1844-1849), the Russian Orthodox Church on the Neroberg (1847-1855), the Monopteros (1863-1869, also on the Neroberg) and the Ministerialgebäude which house the Hessian Ministry of Justice (1854). These were followed by the Old Synagogue at Michelsberg (1863-1869), the Waterloo Monument on the Luisenplatz (1865) and the Kaiser-Wilhelms-Heilanstalt (1868-1871, now connected to the Stadtschloss).

Outside Wiesbaden, he also designed two buildings in Bad Schwalbach – the Anglican Church for English visitors (1874) and the baths (1879).

Hoffmann died, aged 82, in San Remo.

== Gallery ==
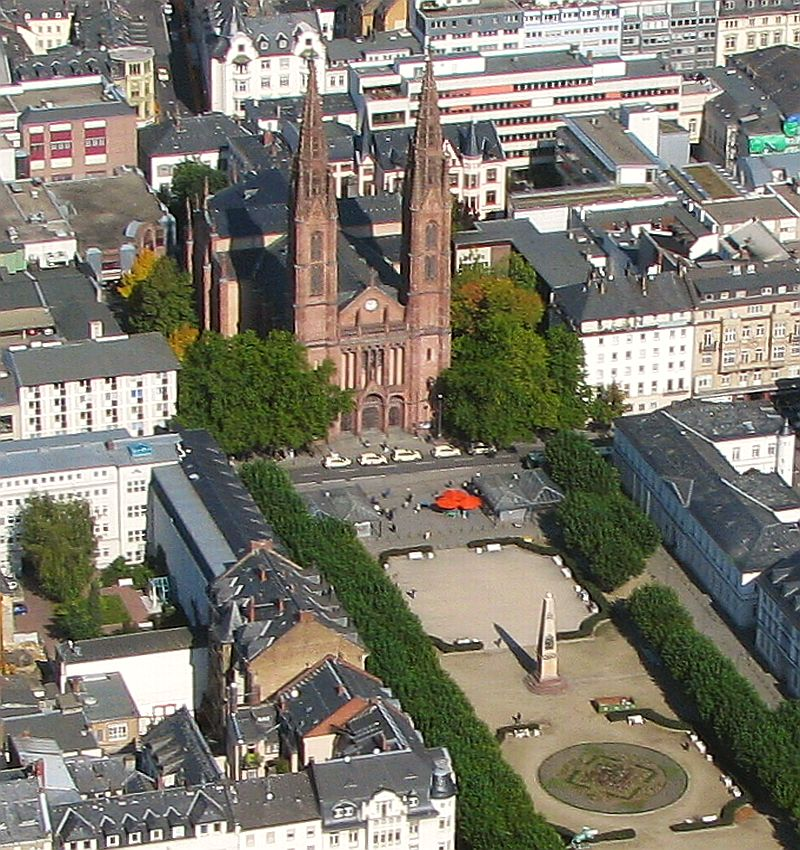
Aerial view of St. Bonifatius Church on the Luisenplatz in Wiesbaden

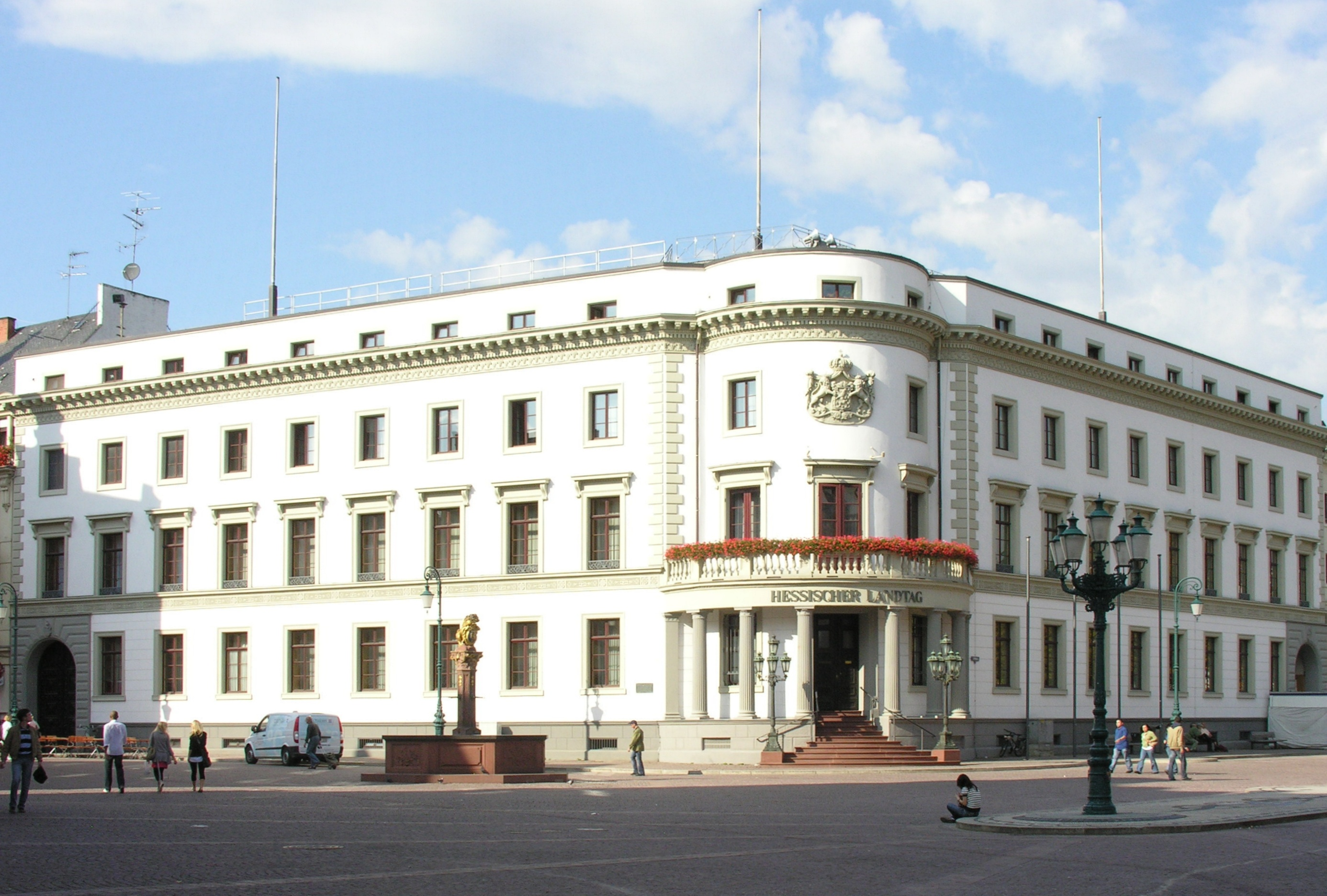
The Stadtschloss in Wiesbaden (now used to house the Hessischen Landtag)

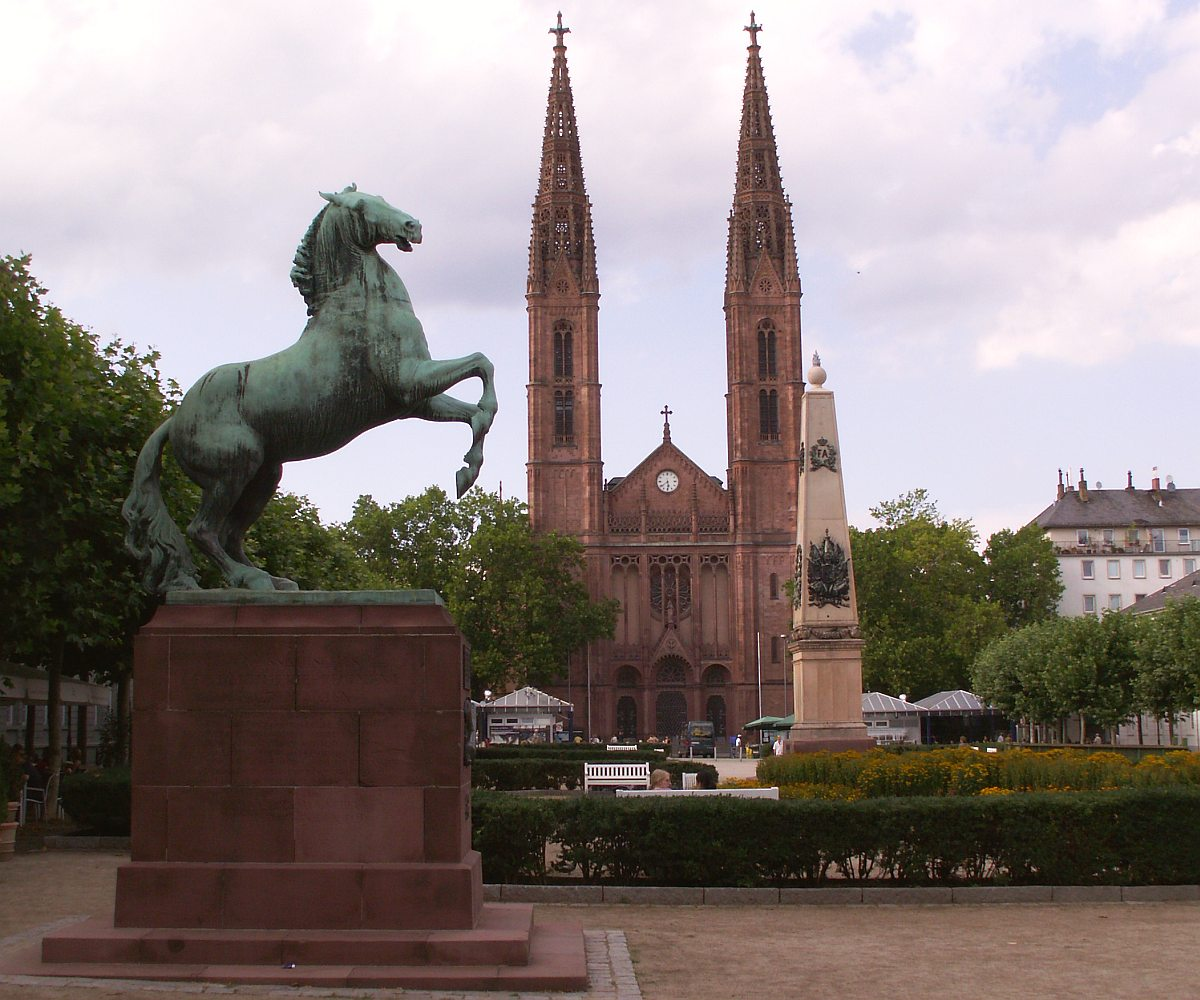
The Waterloo Obelisk in the Luisenplatz in Wiesbaden, with the St. Bonifatius Church in the background

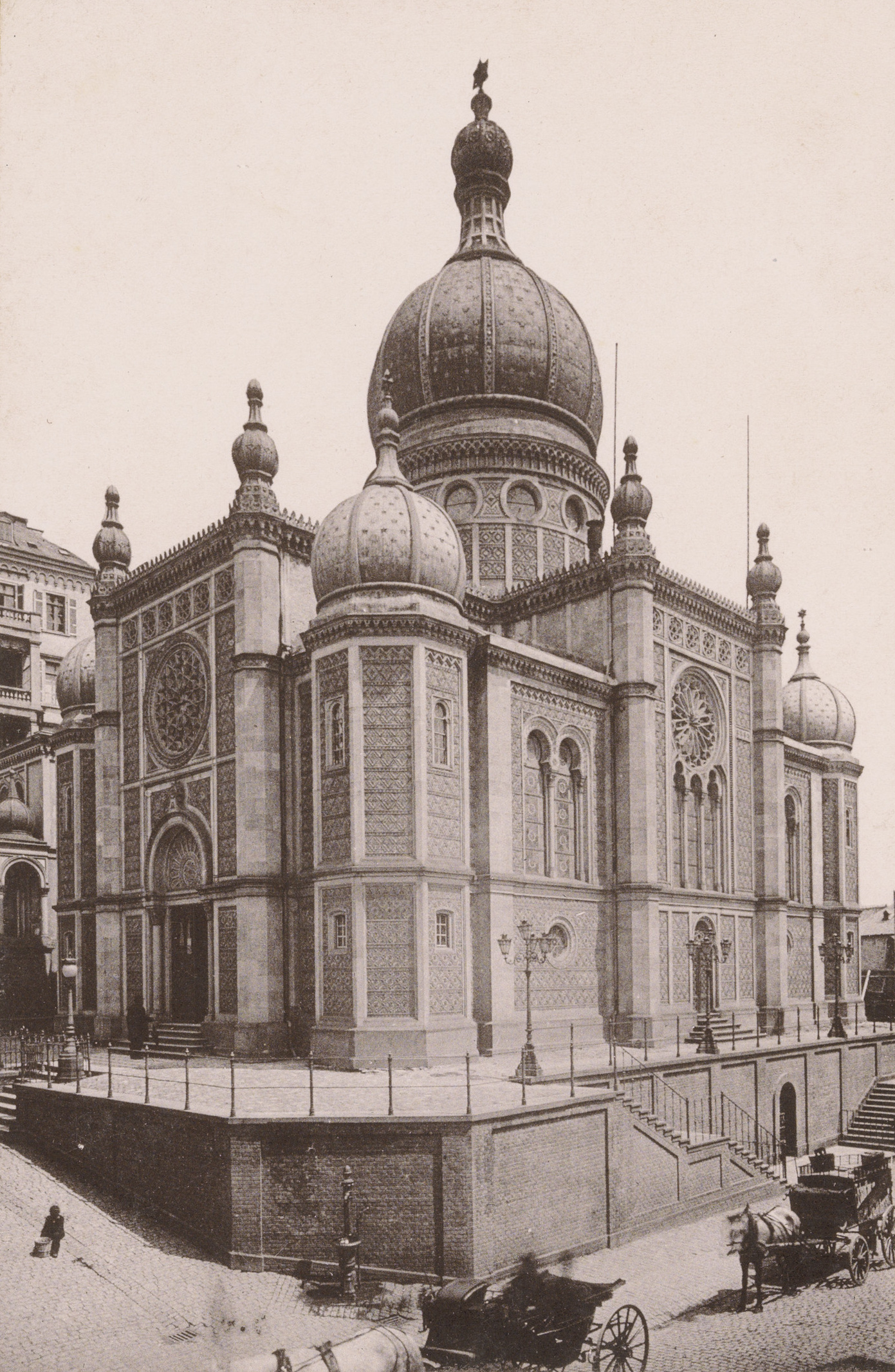
Wiesbaden's Old Synagogue (1863–1869), destroyed 1938 in the Kristallnacht

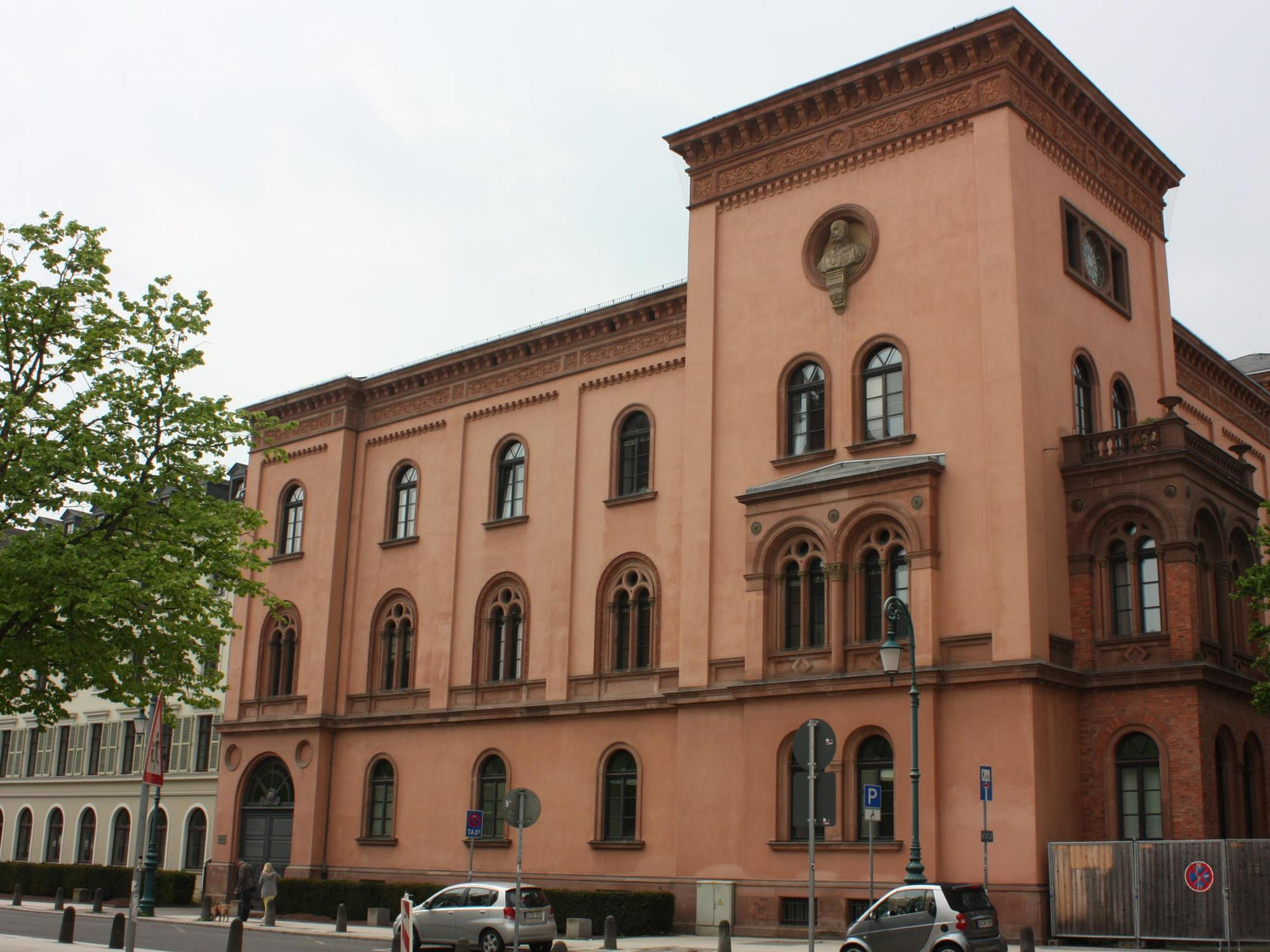
The Wilhelmbau (Wilhelm's Building) of the Wiesbaden Stadtschloss, built 1868-1871, which is now part of the Hesse state parliament complex.

== Sources ==
- Literature by and about Philipp Hoffmann (architect) in the German National Library catalogue
- (in German) Manfred Laufs (ed.): Philipp Hoffmann (1806–1889). [Arbeitshefte des Landesamtes für Denkmalpflege Hessen, Band 12.] Theiss, Stuttgart 2007, ISBN 3-8062-2166-9
