= Marienthal (Geisenheim) =

- Stadtteil of Geisenheim
- Interactive map of Marienthal
- Location within Germany Location within Hesse
- Coordinates: 50°0′20″N 7°57′0″E
- Country: Germany
- State: Hesse
- Admin. region: Darmstadt
- District: Rheingau-Taunus-Kreis
- Town: Geisenheim
- Elevation: 255 m (837 ft)

Population
  - Total: 1,977
- Time zone: UTC+01:00 (CET)
  - Summer (DST): UTC+02:00 (CEST)
- Postal codes: 65366
- Dialling codes: 06722
- Vehicle registration: RÜD

Marienthal (German pronunciation: [maˈʁiːənˌtaːl]) is a Stadtteil of Geisenheim, Hesse, Germany. It lies on the edge of the Naturpark Rhein-Taunus.

== Culture and sightseeing ==
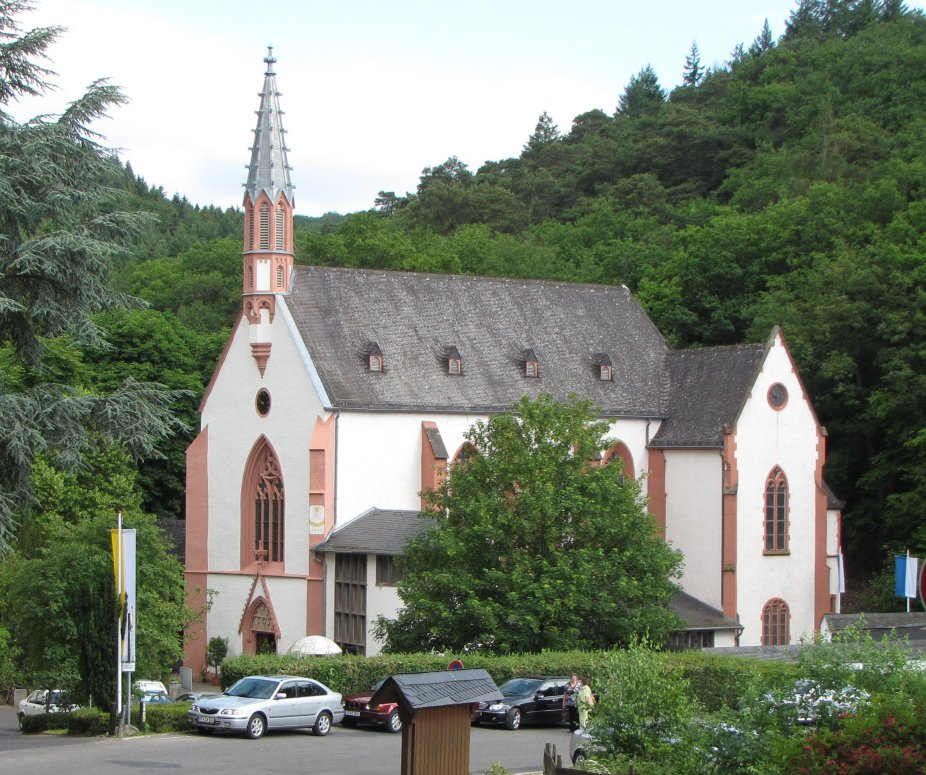
Kloster Marienthal

Marienthal Franciscan Monastery known for its Marienwallfahrt pilgrimage and for being the first monastery in the world to have a printing press.
