= Geisenheim Yeast Breeding Center =

German center studying yeast breeding

Coordinates: 49°59′03″N 7°57′41″E

Simple diagram of yeast cell

The Geisenheim Yeast Breeding Center was founded in 1894 and is located in the town of Geisenheim, in Germany's Rheingau.

== History ==
In 1876 Swiss-born professor Hermann Müller joined the Geisenheim Institute, where he developed his namesake grape variety Müller-Thurgau, which became Germany's most-planted grape variety in the 1970s. He was selecting yeasts for the institutes necessities. But it was Julius Wortmann on whose initiative the foundation of the renowned yeast breeding center in 1894 took place under director Rudolf Goethe. This center continued and transferred the pathbreaking studies of Louis Pasteur and Emil Christian Hansen, achieved by isolating pure yeast and the dissemination of these, of which in practice makes a significant contribution to the improvement of quality in winemaking. Institutions followed this example all over the world.

Julius Wortmann succeeded Goethe as director on 1 April 1903 of the educational institution for wine, fruit and horticulture (the official name since 1901). He held his office as director for a total of 18 years, until 1921. As director, Wortmann led the work of his predecessor and father-in-law Rudolf Goethe. In 1905 a modern winery was founded, with a wine press house and the educational establishment acquired the Geisenheim vineyard ″Fuchsberg″ still famous today comprising 5 ha of grape stock. Under Julius Wortmann it came also to important future-oriented changes. In the course of studies, teaching and examination contents have been adapted consequently.

In 1924 the "yeast breeding center" was integrated in the "plant physiological experimental station" of the educational and research institute for wine, fruit and vegetables and horticulture under the direction of Prof. Dr. Karl Kroemer.

In 1932 a renaming of the "Plant Physiological Experimental Station" to "Botanical Institute" under the direction of Prof. Dr. Hugo Schanderl took place. Essential research areas were the systematic treatment of the problematic yeasts, as well as other biofilm forming yeasts and their interactions with pure yeasts. Hugo Schanderl wrote the first book on the microbiology of must and wine.

Since 1966 Prof. Dr. Helmut Hans Dittrich became head of the department research on metabolic physiological performance of microorganisms in the medium must. Fermentation process and selection of yeasts with low formation SO_{2}-binding metabolites were also in the foreground such as studies on origin and avoidance of microbially conditioned false aromas such as acetic acid, ester tone, buckwheat and lactic acid note. New drying technologies simplified the application of pure yeast cultures as dry instant powder and the breeding of cultures regained importance.

A hundred years after its foundation the "Department of Microbiology and Biochemistry" came under the direction of Prof. Dr. Manfred Großmann. His research and development work was in the areas of stress research, aroma development and biotechnological implementation of the findings of microbial processes in juice, wine and wine-associated production areas such as cool climate. New Research fields to be added were genetically modified wine yeasts and risk accompanying research for their use as well as aroma development in wines through the use of microbial mixed cultures. The Geisenheim Yeast Finder supports practitioners in finding suitable yeast for their application.

Since 2019 the center focuses on working on lager and wine yeast strain improvements in fermentation and aroma compound production and has started work on biocontrol agents, the necrotrophic mycoparasitic predator yeasts. This group of yeasts is able to kill other fungi in a process known as necrotrophic mycoparasitism. Geisenheim has started to unravel the molecular biology behind this process and look for collaborations to apply these organisms for a more sustainable agriculture.
