= Gerd Nienstedt =

German opera singer (1932–1993)

- Born: 10 July 1932; Hannover, Germany
- Died: 14 August 1993 (aged 61); Vienna, Austria
- Occupations: Opera singer (bass, bass-baritone); Theatre director; Academic voice teacher

Gerd Nienstedt (10 July 1932 – 14 August 1993) was a German and Austrian opera singer, bass and bass-baritone. After an international career at major opera houses and the Bayreuth Festival, he was also a theatre director, stage director and academic voice teacher.

== Career ==
Karl Gustav Gerhard Nienstedt was born in Hanover. He studied voice at the Opernschule there with Otto Köhler. His first engagement was in 1954 at the Stadttheater Bremerhaven, where he made his debut as the king in Lohengrin. He sang in Gelsenkirchen from 1955 to 1959, with the Staatstheater Wiesbaden to 1961, with the Cologne Opera from 1962 to 1972, and with the Frankfurt Opera. In 1965, he participated in the premiere of Bernd Alois Zimmermann's Die Soldaten in Cologne, singing the part of Haudy. He performed also in the Frankfurt production of the opera.

Nienstedt performed at the Bayreuth Festival every summer from 1962 to 1976, in 14 parts such as Klingsor in Parsifal, Gunther in Götterdämmerung, Donner in Das Rheingold, Hunding in Die Walküre, Fafner (the dragon) in Siegfried, and Kothner in Die Meistersinger von Nürnberg.

He was a member of the Vienna State Opera from 1964 to 1973, became an Austrian citizen and was awarded the title Kammersänger. He performed at the Théâtre de la Monnaie in Brussels several times between 1964 and 1983, including the parts Orest in Elektra by Strauss, Rocco in Beethoven's Fidelio, Marke in Tristan und Isolde and Gurnemanz in Parsifal. He sang in 1968 at the Bayerische Staatsoper the part of King Wladislaw in Smetana's Dalibor, conducted by Rafael Kubelik, and in 1971 at La Scala the title role of Alban Berg's Wozzeck, conducted by Claudio Abbado and alongside Evelyn Lear as Marie.

In concert, Nienstedt sang the bass part in Bach's St Matthew Passion at the 1977 Osterfestspiele Salzburg. Herbert von Karajan conducted the Wiener Singverein and the Berlin Philharmonic, with Peter Schreier as the Evangelist and Jose van Dam as the vox Christi. In 1979 he performed in the premiere of the three-act version of Alban Berg's Lulu the parts of the animal tamer and Rodrigo, staged by Patrice Chéreau and conducted by Pierre Boulez, a performance recorded on DVD. Again with Boulez, he was in 1987 a soloist in Schoenberg's Gurre-Lieder in the Royal Albert Hall.

From 1973, Nienstedt worked in the direction of the Bielefeld Opera, of the Theater Hof from 1981 to 1985. and of the Landestheater Detmold from 1985 to 1987. Nienstedt was director and artistic director of the Eutiner Festspiele from 1982 to 1988. He appeared occasionally, for example in 1980 as the narrator in a performance of Honegger's König David by the Rheingauer Kantorei and the Radiosinfonieorchester Frankfurt in the Marktkirche Wiesbaden, with soloists Klesie Kelly and Claudia Eder.

As a teacher, he taught voice at the opera class of the Peter Cornelius Conservatory of Mainz, from 1987 acting at the opera class of the Nordwestdeutsche Musikakademie Detmold (now Hochschule für Musik Detmold), and as professor of voice at the Konservatorium der Stadt Wien (now Konservatorium Wien Privatuniversität). He died in Vienna.

== Selected recordings ==
- Alban Berg – Lulu, Rodrigo, Orchestre de l'Opéra de Paris, Pierre Boulez (1979, DVD)
- Gustav Mahler – Das Klagende Lied, London Symphony Orchestra, Pierre Boulez (1970)
- W.A. Mozart – Requiem: BBC Symphony Orchestra, Colin Davis (1967)
- Giuseppe Verdi – Rigoletto: Monterone, Orchestra of the Vienna State Opera, Carlo Franci (1970)
- Richard Wagner – Die Meistersinger von Nürnberg
  - Kothner, Orchestra of the Bayreuth Festival, Silvio Varviso (1974)
  - Kothner, Wiener Philharmoniker dirigiert von Georg Solti (1975)
- Wagner – Tannhäuser
  - Reinmar, Orchestra of the Bayreuth Festival, Wolfgang Sawallisch (1962)
  - Reinmar, Orchestra of the Bayreuth Festival, Otmar Suitner (1964)
  - Biterolf, Orchestra of the Bayreuth Festival, Carl Melles (1966)
- Wagner – Das Rheingold
  - Gürzenich Orchestra, Wolfgang Sawallisch (1962)
  - Donner, Orchestra of the Bayreuth Festival, Karl Böhm, (1966)
- Wagner – Die Walküre: Hunding, Orchestra of the Bayreuth Festival, Karl Böhm, (1967)
- Wagner – Tristan und Isolde: Steuermann, Orchestra of the Bayreuth Festival, Karl Böhm (1966)
- Wagner – Parsifal: Orchestra of the Bayreuth Festival, Hans Knappertsbusch
- Wagner – Lohengrin: Heerrufer, Orchestra of the Bayreuth Festival, Rafael Kubelik (1971)
- Bernd Alois Zimmermann – Die Soldaten: Haudy, Gürzenich Orchestra, Michael Gielen (1965, WERGO)
