= Dieter Klöcker =

German clarinetist (1936–2011)

Dieter Klöcker (13 April 1936 – 21 May 2011) was a German clarinetist known for rediscovering many forgotten composers of the 18th century, specifically forgotten music for the clarinet.

From 1975 to 2002, Klöcker taught clarinet and chamber wind music at the Hochschule für Musik Freiburg. He was the founder and leader of Consortium Classicum.

== Publications (selection) ==
- Musicological research articles in various journals on Ludwig van Beethoven, Antonio Casimir Cartellieri, Joseph Haydn, Franz Anton Hoffmeister, Giacomo Meyerbeer, Wolfgang Amadeus Mozart, Ignaz Pleyel and others.
- Handbuch der Musikpädagogik, vol. 3, Bärenreiter 1994, "Die Klarinette"
- Medizinische Probleme bei Instrumentalisten, Laaber Verlag 1995, "Ursache und Wirkung"
- Kongreßbericht 1997 des Forschungsinstituts für Instrumental- und Gesangspädagogik, Schott 1998, "Fehlgeleitete Musikerpotentiale"
- Konzertante Sinfonien, CD booklet EMI 747 98 10 (CDF 671008), 1977/1995
- Consortium Classicum: Wolfgang Amadeus Mozart: Harmoniemusiken (3 CDs) – The CDs contain arrangements from Die Entführung aus dem Serail, Die Zauberflöte, La Clemenza di Tito, Die Hochzeit des Figaro and Don Giovanni.
