= Claudia Eder =

German opera singer (born 1948)

- Born: 7 February 1948 (age 78); Augsburg, Bavaria, Germany
- Education: Hochschule für Musik und Theater München; Hochschule für Musik und Darstellende Kunst Frankfurt am Main
- Occupations: Classical mezzo-soprano; Academic teacher
- Organizations: Hessisches Staatstheater Wiesbaden; Staatstheater am Gärtnerplatz; Vienna Volksoper; Deutsche Oper am Rhein; Hochschule für Musik Mainz

Claudia Eder (born 7 February 1948) is a German mezzo-soprano in opera and concert, and an academic at the Hochschule für Musik Mainz.

== Career ==
Eder was born in Augsburg on 7 February 1948. She studied voice and cello at the Hochschule für Musik und Theater München, the Hochschule für Musik und Darstellende Kunst Frankfurt am Main, in Budapest and Milan. Her voice teachers were Elsa Cavelti, Marianne Schech, Jenö Sipos and Maria Castellani.

Her debut was in 1973 at Bielefeld Opera in the role of Nicklausse in Offenbach's Les contes d'Hoffmann. She appeared at the Hessisches Staatstheater Wiesbaden and the Staatstheater am Gärtnerplatz from 1975, at the Vienna Volksoper from 1982, and the Deutsche Oper am Rhein in Düsseldorf from 1995.

In Vienna she appeared in 1987 in the opera Die Weise von Liebe und Tod des Cornets Christoph Rilke after Rilke's poem, of Siegfried Matthus (1984). In Düsseldorf she portrayed the title role of Bizet's Carmen. Other roles included Dorabella in Mozart's Così fan tutte, Rossini's La Cenerentola, Meg in Verdi's Falstaff, and Hansel in Humperdinck's Hänsel und Gretel.

She sang the roles of La Muse and Nicklausse on a recording conducted by Seiji Ozawa, with Plácido Domingo, Edita Gruberová, Christa Ludwig, Gabriel Bacquier and Justino Díaz, among others. A review of Andrew Lamb noted: "I very much like Claudia Eder as Nicklausse, though. Her voice is full of youthful confidence and flexibility, and her singing of her alternative Act 2 song Voyez-la sous son eventail is a real delight." In 1993 she appeared at the Salzburg Festival as Octavian in Der Rosenkavalier of Richard Strauss. In 2002 she sang in Mainz in the premiere of the opera on Johannes Gutenberg by Gavin Bryars, G (Being the Confession and Last Testament of Johannes Gensfleisch, also known as Gutenberg, Master Printer, formerly of Strasbourg and Mainz), the role of Frau Beildeck.

She brought dramatic action to the concert stage as well, singing the alto part in Honegger's Le Roi David in a performance in 1980 in the Marktkirche in Wiesbaden with the Rheingauer Kantorei and the Radiosinfonieorchester Frankfurt, conducted by Frank Stähle, portraying the young David as well as the Witch of Endor. On 21 November 1981, she sang in Bach's Mass in B minor with the same choir as part of the Vierte Wiesbadener Bachwochen (Fourth Wiesbaden Bach Weeks).

She has been teaching voice at the Hochschule für Musik Mainz, part of the University of Mainz since 1984 and was appointed professor in 1988. In a concert to mark her appointment she performed a cantata Arianna a Naxos of Joseph Haydn, a new composition by the conductor Wolfgang Hofmann, Wirklichkeit unserer unverläßliches Märchen after Rose Ausländer, Ottorino Respighi's Il Tramonto, and Zigeunerlieder of Johannes Brahms. She became "Prorektorin" (vice president) of the Hochschule in 1999, founded its international summer school in 2004, and received a fellowship of the Gutenberg Forschungskolleg in 2010.

In 2006, she received, as the first woman artist, the Akademiepreis des Landes (Academy prize of the State Rhineland-Palatinate). In 2009 she became a member of the Akademie der Wissenschaften und der Literatur (Academy of the Sciences and Literature).
