= Rheingauer Dom =

- Pfarrkirche Heilig Kreuz
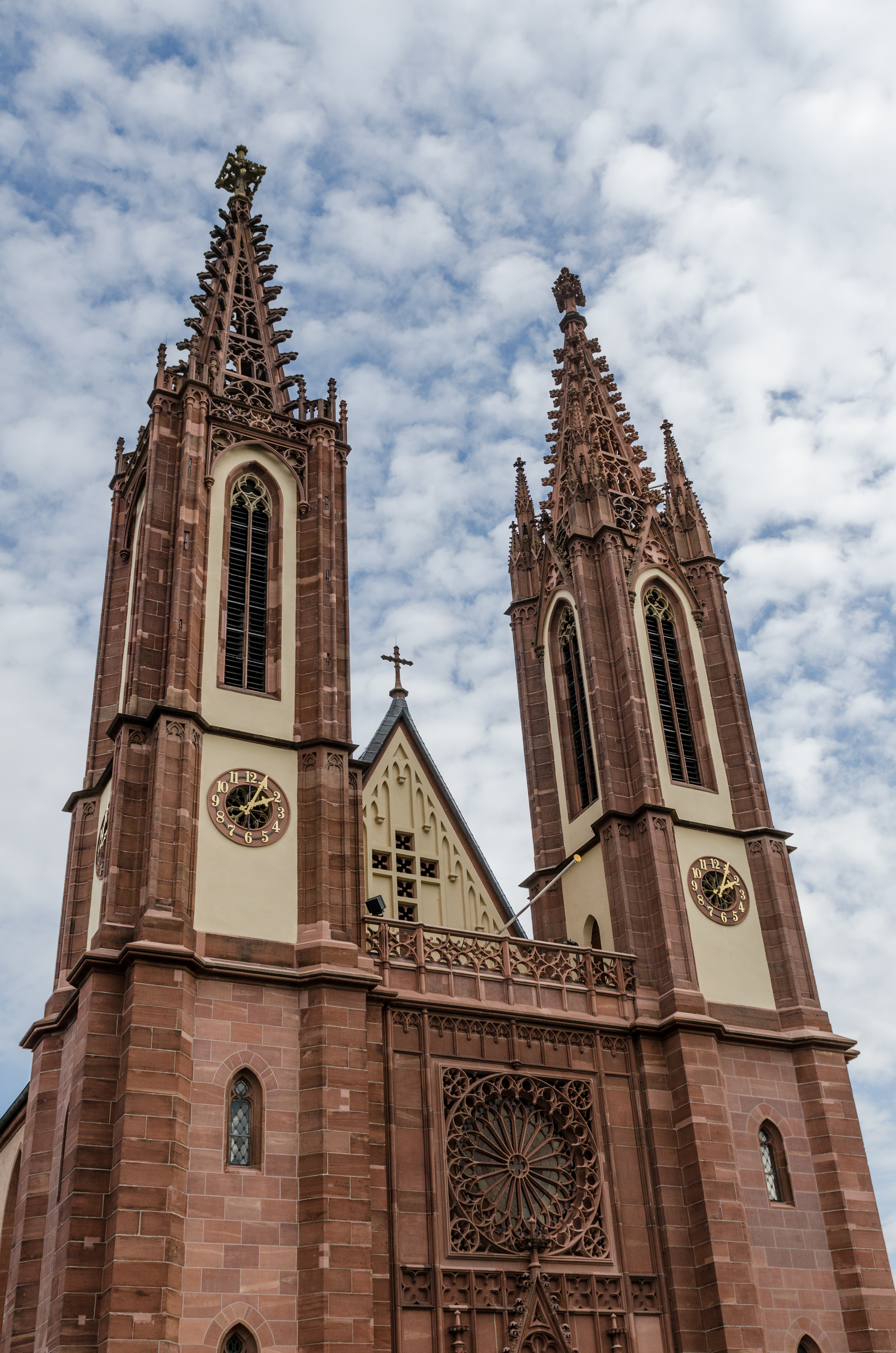
- West facade of the church by Philipp Hoffmann, 2013

- Location within Hesse Location within Germany
- 49°58′58″N 7°58′3″E
- Location: Geisenheim, Germany
- Denomination: Roman Catholic
- Website: heilig-kreuz-rheingau.de

History
- Dedication: Holy Cross
- Consecrated: 16th century

Architecture
- Architects: anonymous; Philipp Hoffmann
- Style: Gothic; Neo-Gothic

Administration
- Diocese: Limburg

Rheingauer Dom is the colloquial name for the Catholic parish church in Geisenheim, Germany. Officially Pfarrkirche Heilig Kreuz (Holy Cross), the large church in the Rheingau region is called Dom although it was never a bishop's seat. The present building was begun in the 16th century, but major features such as an expansion of the nave from three to five vaults, the towers, the organ and several altars were added in the 19th century. The parish is part of the Diocese of Limburg.

== History ==
The present building began as a late-Gothic hall church, built mostly from 1510 to 1518. It succeeded a Romanesque church first mentioned in 1146. In 1829, the west towers had to be demolished because they were unsafe. The architect Philipp Hoffmann, who was born in Geisenheim, proposed to expand the church and build a new facade and towers. Hoffmann, who later built landmarks in Wiesbaden such as St. Bonifatius and the Russian Church, expanded the nave by adding two more vaults similar to the three Gothic ones, and created a new west facade with neo-Gothic towers. The large church is called Dom although it was never a bishop's seat.

The towers were restored from 2010 to 2014. The celebration of the completion was on Pentecost 2014, with a "Mass of All Saints" by Alan Wilson, performed by church choir and children's choir conducted by Florian Brachtendorf.

The church is a venue of the Rheingau Musik Festival and other concerts, including choral concerts of the Rheingauer Kantorei.

== Interior ==
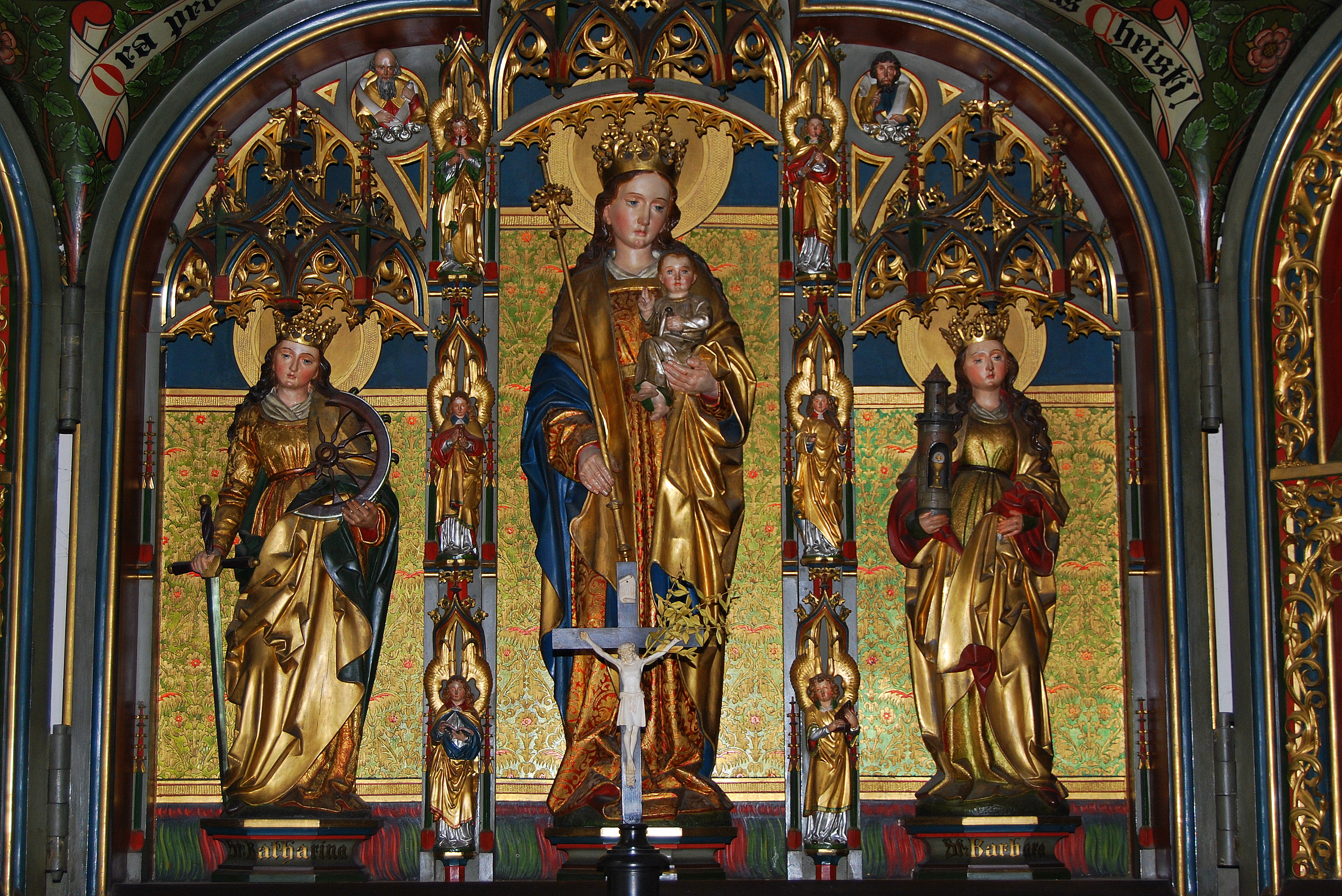
Marienaltar

Features from the Gothic structure are the vault and the Dreikönigsaltar. The high altar in neo-Gothic style was installed in 1886. Another neo-Gothic altar, the Marienaltar, was created by Caspar Weis in 1894.

The organ was commissioned in 1839 and built in 1842 by Gebrüder Stumm, with 31 stops, two keyboards and pedal. It is the largest instrument with two manuals that the company built. In 1987, the organ was restored to its original state of the Romantic period. Martin Lücker played in 2012 a concert with a program that Albert Schweitzer had performed in Frankfurt in 1928 on a similar instrument that was destroyed.

== Gallery ==
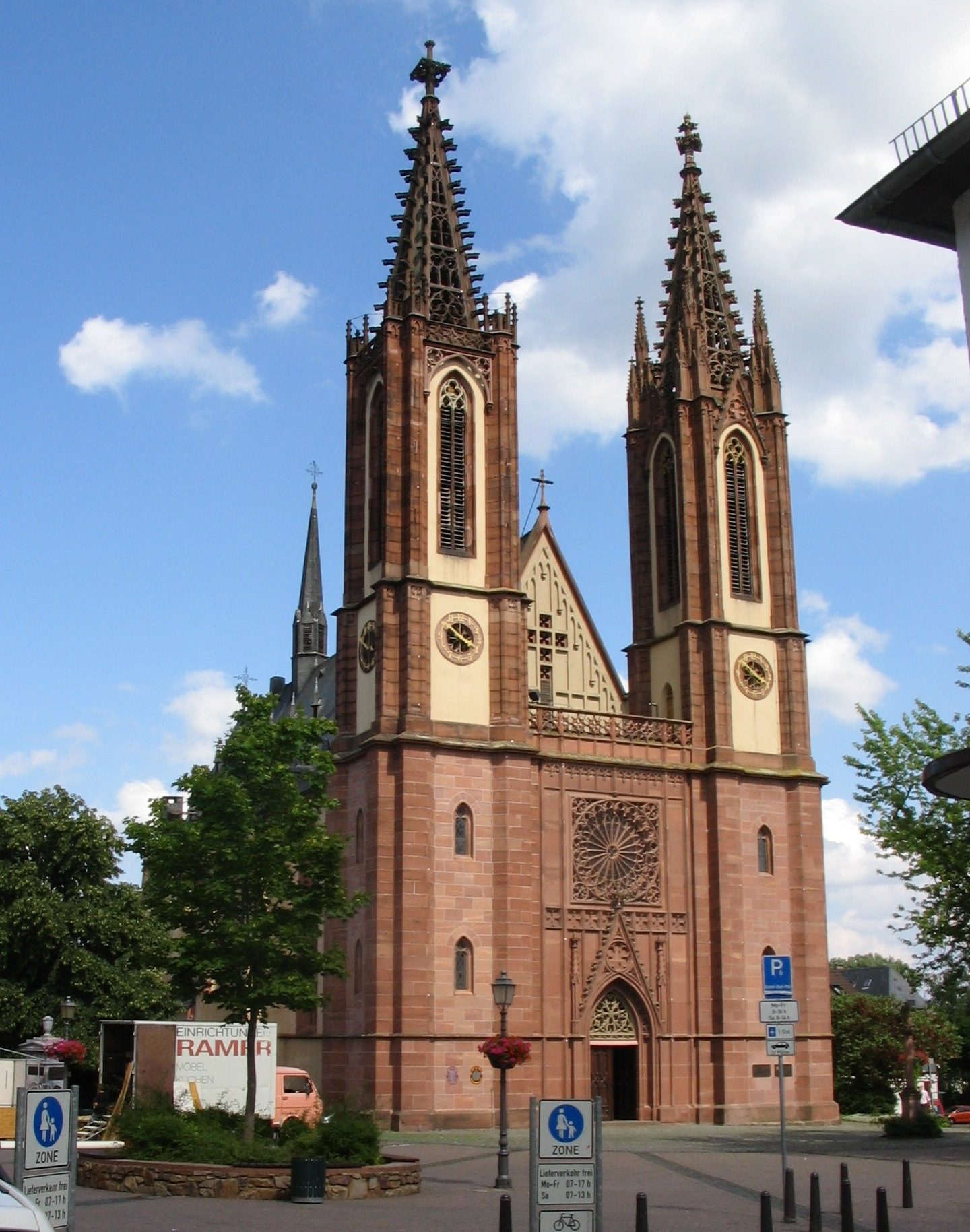
West facade

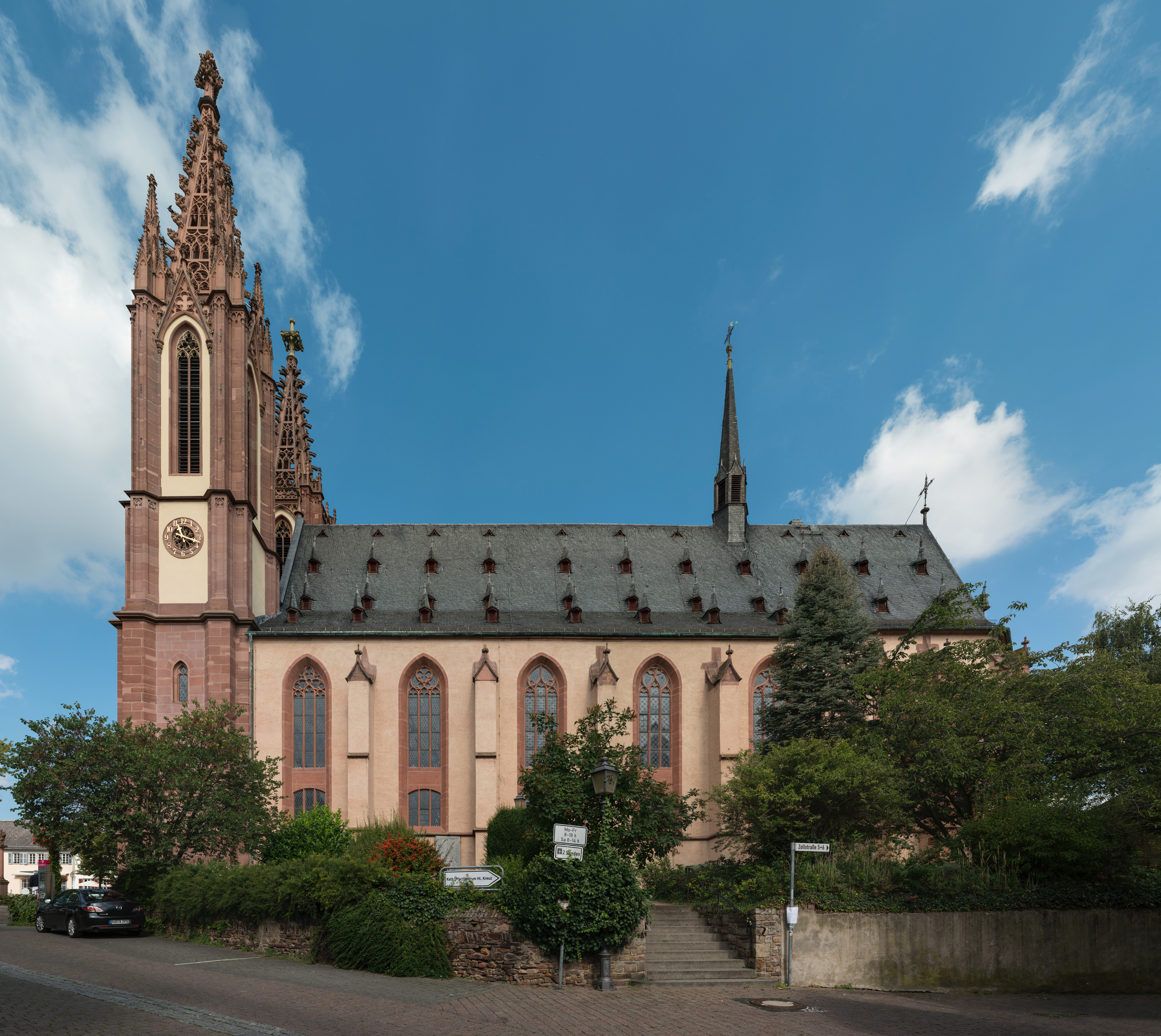
Viem from the South

Interior

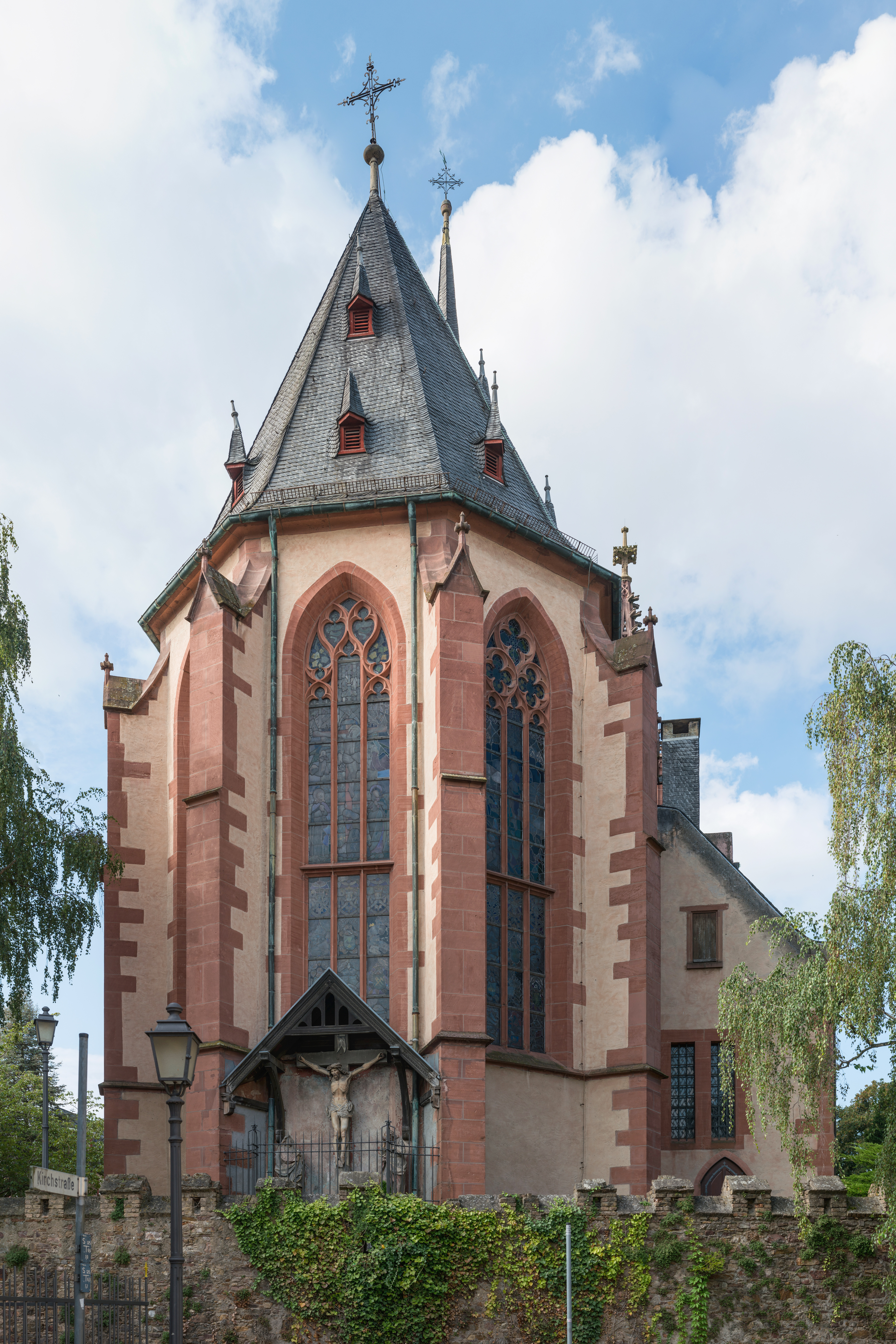
Exterior of the Choir
