= Consortium Classicum =

German chamber orchestra

The Consortium Classicum is a German chamber orchestra.

In the early 1960s, German clarinetist Dieter Klöcker founded the Consortium Classicum, a German chamber music ensemble to bring back to life rediscovered musical works. These works use only wind instruments as well as the combination of woodwinds and strings, up to nine players. The members of the ensemble are all soloists, professors from music academies and leaders from first class orchestras, who uphold the ensemble's concept in a very individual and consistent manner.
