= Geisenheim =

- Town
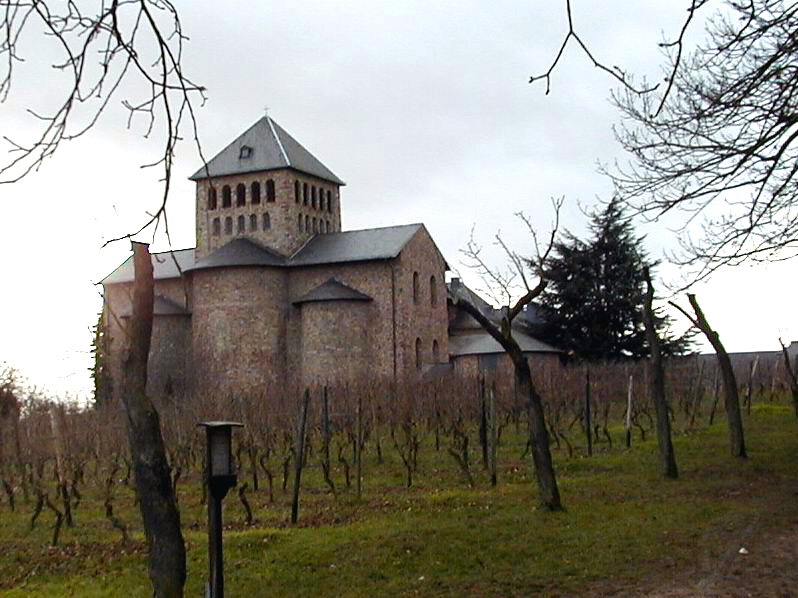
- Schloss Johannisberg Basilica

- Coat of arms

- Location of Geisenheim within Rheingau-Taunus-Kreis district
- Interactive map of Geisenheim
- Location within Germany Location within Hesse
- Coordinates: 49°59′4″N 7°58′2″E
- Country: Germany
- State: Hesse
- Admin. region: Darmstadt
- District: Rheingau-Taunus-Kreis
- Subdivisions: 4 districts

Government
  - Mayor (2023–29): Christan Aßmann

Area
  - Total: 40.34 km^{2} (15.58 sq mi)
- Elevation: 95 m (312 ft)

Population (2025-12-31)
  - Total: 11,184
  - Density: 277.2/km^{2} (718.1/sq mi)
- Time zone: UTC+01:00 (CET)
  - Summer (DST): UTC+02:00 (CEST)
- Postal codes: 65366
- Dialling codes: 06722
- Vehicle registration: RÜD, SWA
- Website: www.geisenheim.de

Geisenheim (German pronunciation: [ˈɡaɪzn̩ˌhaɪm]) is a town in the Rheingau-Taunus-Kreis in the Regierungsbezirk of Darmstadt in Hessen, Germany, and is known as Weinstadt (“Wine Town”), Schulstadt (“School Town”), Domstadt (“Cathedral Town”) and Lindenstadt (“Linden Tree Town”).

== Geography ==
=== Location ===
Geisenheim lies on the Rhine’s right bank between Wiesbaden and Rüdesheim, 3 km away to the west. Mainz lies 21 km away to the east.

=== Neighbouring communities ===
Geisenheim borders in the north on the town of Lorch, in the east on the town of Oestrich-Winkel, in the south on the towns of Ingelheim and Bingen (both in Mainz-Bingen in Rhineland-Palatinate) and in the west on the town of Rüdesheim.

=== Constituent communities ===
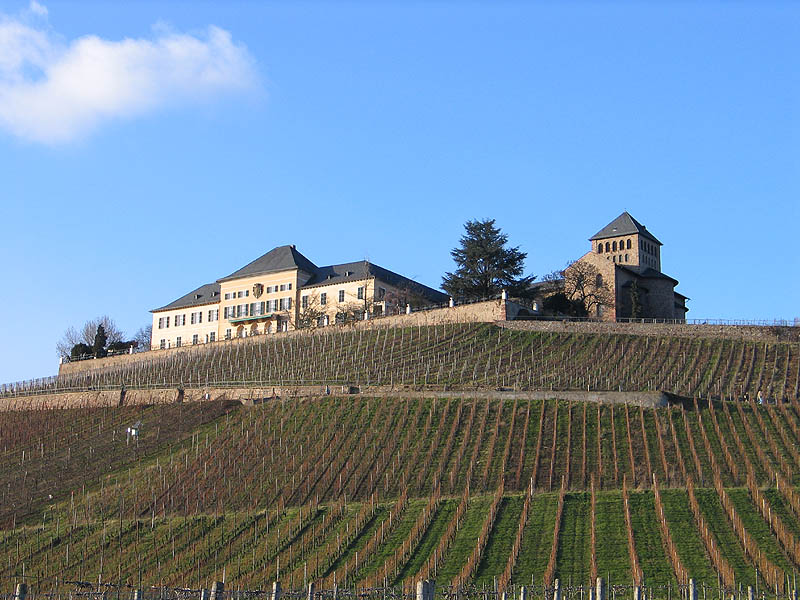
Schloss Johannisberg

The town of Geisenheim is divided into four Stadtteile: the main town (also called Geisenheim), Johannisberg (Grund, Berg, Schloßheide), Marienthal and Stephanshausen.

Johannisberg might well be the best known of Geisenheim’s constituent communities, being the birthplace of Spätlese (more precisely, the systematic production of Auslesen), and being known worldwide for its appellation.

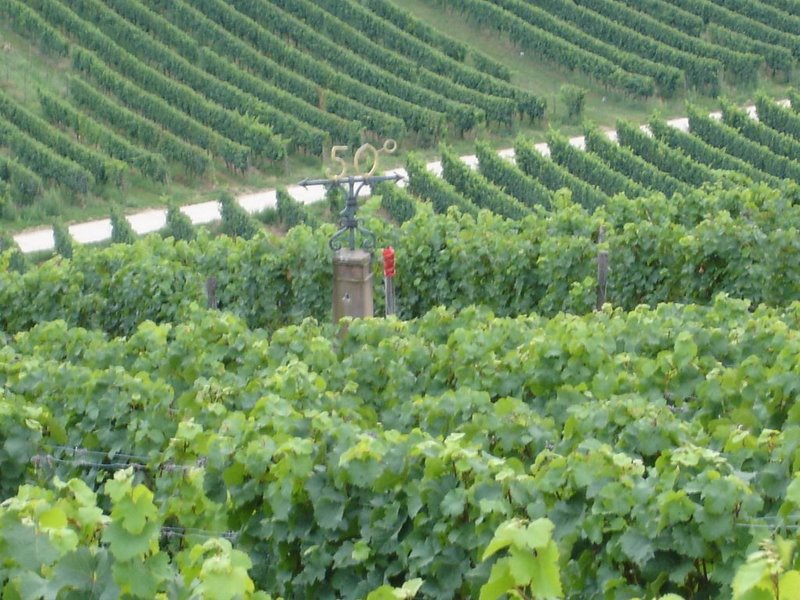
50th parallel north, in the middle of a vineyard

At Schloss Johannisberg, a statue today still recalls the unknown Spätlesereiter (“Late Harvest Rider”). Through the vineyards here, below the Schloss runs the 50th parallel of north latitude. Prince Klemens Wenzel von Metternich acquired the Schloss domain in 1816 after the Congress of Vienna from its former holder, Emperor Franz I as a gift.

Marienthal gets its name from the nearby Marienthal Monastery. The monastery is well known for its Marienwallfahrt (pilgrimage), and here was also the world's first monastery printing shop.

=== Climate ===
Geisenheim has an oceanic climate (Köppen: Cfb), although slightly more extreme than coastal cities, the city is still strongly influenced by the west winds due to flat relief and the presence of inland seas. The relatively mild climate makes the cidae one of the leading regions of quality wines, as well as elsewhere in Rheingau (covered with hills that protect from the cold in the Rhine valley).

The weather station has been operating since 1884 and is maintained by the DWD's Department of Agricultural Meteorology, near the local state university. The annual precipitation of precipitation is higher than 50 mm between May and September being the most humid, and between January and April the precipitation is less than 40 mm, being the driest. Being close to or equal to 50 °N the duration of sunshine varies greatly between winter and summer ranging from 1.2 hours to 7.2 hours, from December to July. July is the warmest with 23.9 °C high average, going from fresh to hot. The average low in the winter is −1.2 °C, although they are above average during the afternoon.

Climate data for Geisenheim (near of the Hochschule Geisenheim), elevation: 120 m, 1991–2020 normals
Month	Jan	Feb	Mar	Apr	May	Jun	Jul	Aug	Sep	Oct	Nov	Dec	Year
Record high °C (°F)	14.2 (57.6)	18.2 (64.8)	25.1 (77.2)	29.5 (85.1)	31.0 (87.8)	33.8 (92.8)	35.2 (95.4)	35.2 (95.4)	32.1 (89.8)	27.3 (81.1)	18.4 (65.1)	15.5 (59.9)	35.2 (95.4)
Mean daily maximum °C (°F)	5.1 (41.2)	6.7 (44.1)	11.4 (52.5)	16.3 (61.3)	20.3 (68.5)	23.7 (74.7)	25.9 (78.6)	25.5 (77.9)	20.8 (69.4)	14.9 (58.8)	9.0 (48.2)	5.7 (42.3)	15.4 (59.7)
Daily mean °C (°F)	2.5 (36.5)	3.3 (37.9)	6.8 (44.2)	11.0 (51.8)	14.9 (58.8)	18.2 (64.8)	20.2 (68.4)	19.6 (67.3)	15.3 (59.5)	10.6 (51.1)	6.2 (43.2)	3.3 (37.9)	11.0 (51.8)
Mean daily minimum °C (°F)	−0.1 (31.8)	0.1 (32.2)	2.7 (36.9)	5.8 (42.4)	9.7 (49.5)	12.8 (55.0)	14.8 (58.6)	14.3 (57.7)	10.8 (51.4)	7.1 (44.8)	3.6 (38.5)	0.9 (33.6)	6.9 (44.4)
Record low °C (°F)	−18.5 (−1.3)	−16.6 (2.1)	−12.0 (10.4)	−5.2 (22.6)	−0.2 (31.6)	3.4 (38.1)	5.4 (41.7)	5.8 (42.4)	2.7 (36.9)	−2.5 (27.5)	−8.5 (16.7)	−14.4 (6.1)	−18.5 (−1.3)
Average precipitation mm (inches)	39.3 (1.55)	34.0 (1.34)	36.2 (1.43)	30.7 (1.21)	49.8 (1.96)	47.5 (1.87)	57.7 (2.27)	48.3 (1.90)	43.0 (1.69)	45.2 (1.78)	43.1 (1.70)	50.4 (1.98)	525.4 (20.69)
Average precipitation days (≥ 1.0 mm)	16.2	13.5	13.7	12.2	13.4	11.9	13.2	12.1	11.7	15.1	16.0	17.4	166.6
Average snowy days (≥ 1.0 cm)	5.4	2.5	1.2	0	0	0	0	0	0	0	0.2	3.5	12.8
Average relative humidity (%)	81.0	77.1	70.8	64.1	64.6	64.6	64.6	67.1	73.7	81.0	83.7	83.2	73.0
Mean monthly sunshine hours	50.7	80.0	136.5	189.9	212.1	222.0	236.0	221.4	163.1	98.3	48.4	41.7	1,717.1
Source: World Meteorological Organisation View climate chart for this city.

== History ==
Geisenheim had its first documentary mention in 772 and has belonged since the Middle Ages to the Archbishopric of Mainz and later to the Duchy of Nassau, the Kingdom of Prussia and the state of Hesse. Since 1864, Geisenheim has held town rights.

== Politics ==
=== Town council ===
The municipal election held on 26 March 2006 yielded the following results:

Parties and voter communities		% 2006	Seats; 2006	% 2001	Seats; 2001
CDU	Christian Democratic Union of Germany	39.7	15	38.2	14
SPD	Social Democratic Party of Germany	35.0	13	36.6	14
GREENS	Bündnis 90/Die Grünen	8.9	3	10.7	4
FDP	Free Democratic Party	13.2	5	11.0	4
FWG	Freie Wähler Geisenheim und Ortsteile	3.3	1	–	–
REP	The Republicans	–	–	3.5	1
Total		100.0	37	100.0	37
Voter turnout in %		41.8		47.6	

=== Coat of arms ===
Geisenheim's old arms until 1977

New arms since 1977 with the Stephanshausen dragon

Johannisberg's former arms

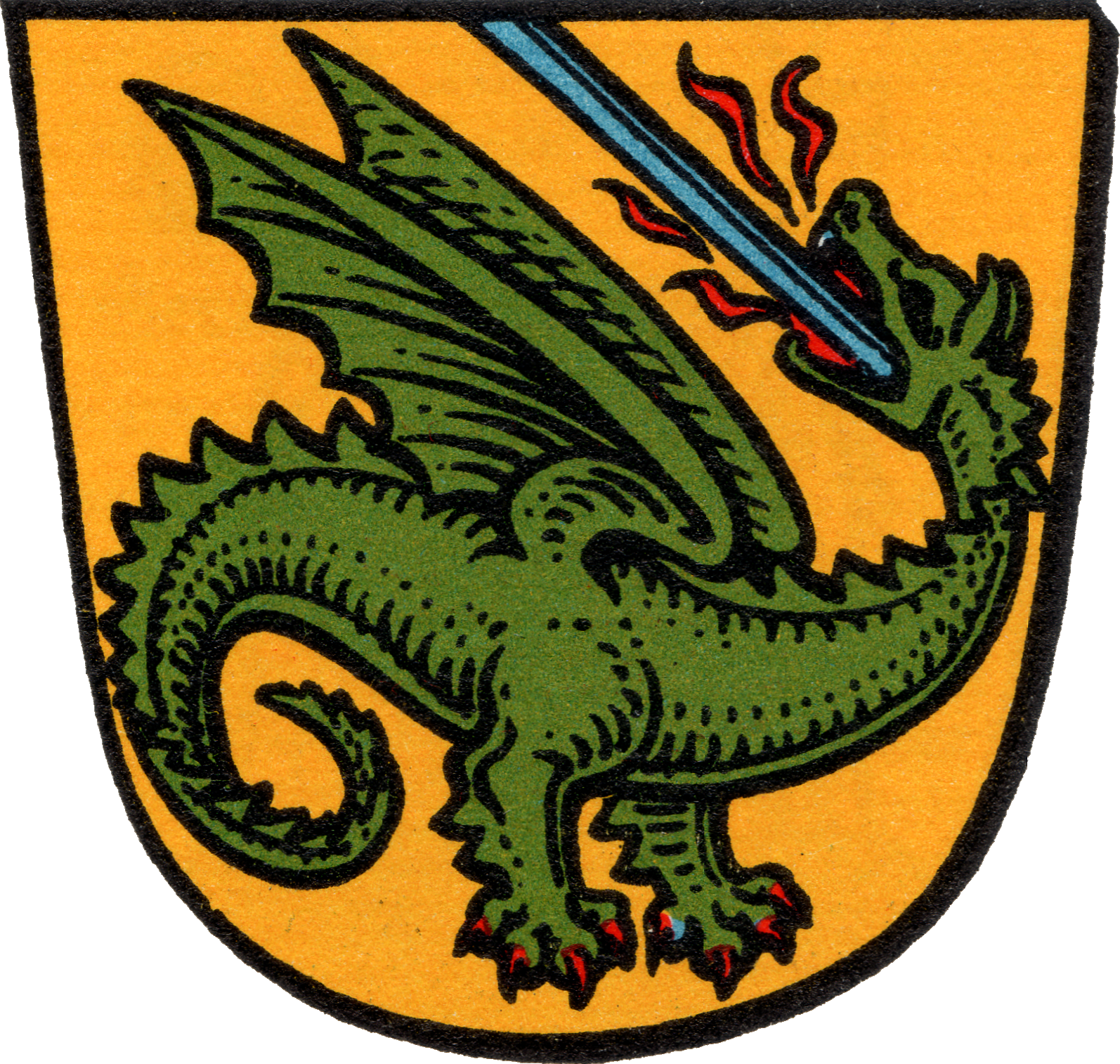
Stephanshausen's former arms

The town's arms might be described thus: Argent two towers with peaked roofs, between them a covered passage at the second floor, in the chief a wheel spoked of six, in the base a two-legged, winged, fire-breathing dragon sinister reguardant, a lance thrust through its mouth, the point protruding from the neck, the whole gules.

After municipal reform in 1972, the town's arms were also adjusted insofar as the charges were altered to reflect the town's absorption of several nearby villages, at least two of which had borne arms. The two former wheel charges – the “Wheels of Mainz” – were replaced with charges from the arms formerly borne by these outlying centres, above with a rather similar-looking wheel, but with six spokes instead of eight (from Johannisberg's arms), and below with a dragon pierced through the mouth and neck with a lance (from Stephanshausen's arms).

=== Town partnerships ===
The town of Geisenheim maintains partnerships with the following places:

- Puligny-Montrachet, Côte-d'Or, France
- Chauvigny, Vienne, France
- Trino, Vercelli, Piedmont, Italy
- Szerencs, Borsod-Abaúj-Zemplén, Hungary

== Culture and sightseeing ==
Right before the town hall is found the great Linden tree, which stands as a symbol of the town. This tree is believed to be 700 years old. In the 1970s the tree lost its top to disease. Each year in the second week of July, the Lindenfest is held with the Stunde der Heimat (the “Homeland’s Hour”, during which citizens who have distinguished themselves are honoured) in the streets between the cathedral and the town hall.

=== Buildings ===
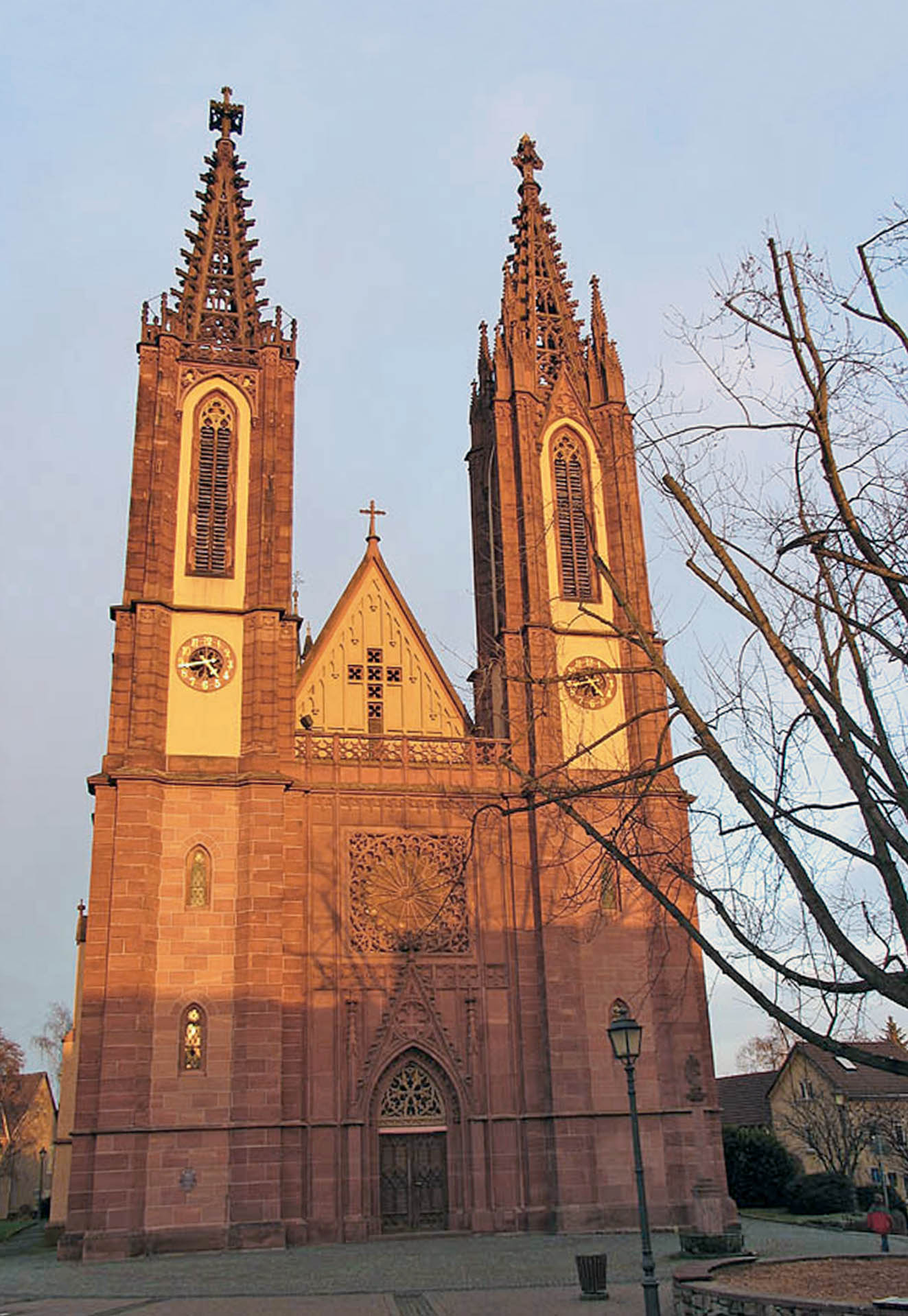
Rheingauer Dom

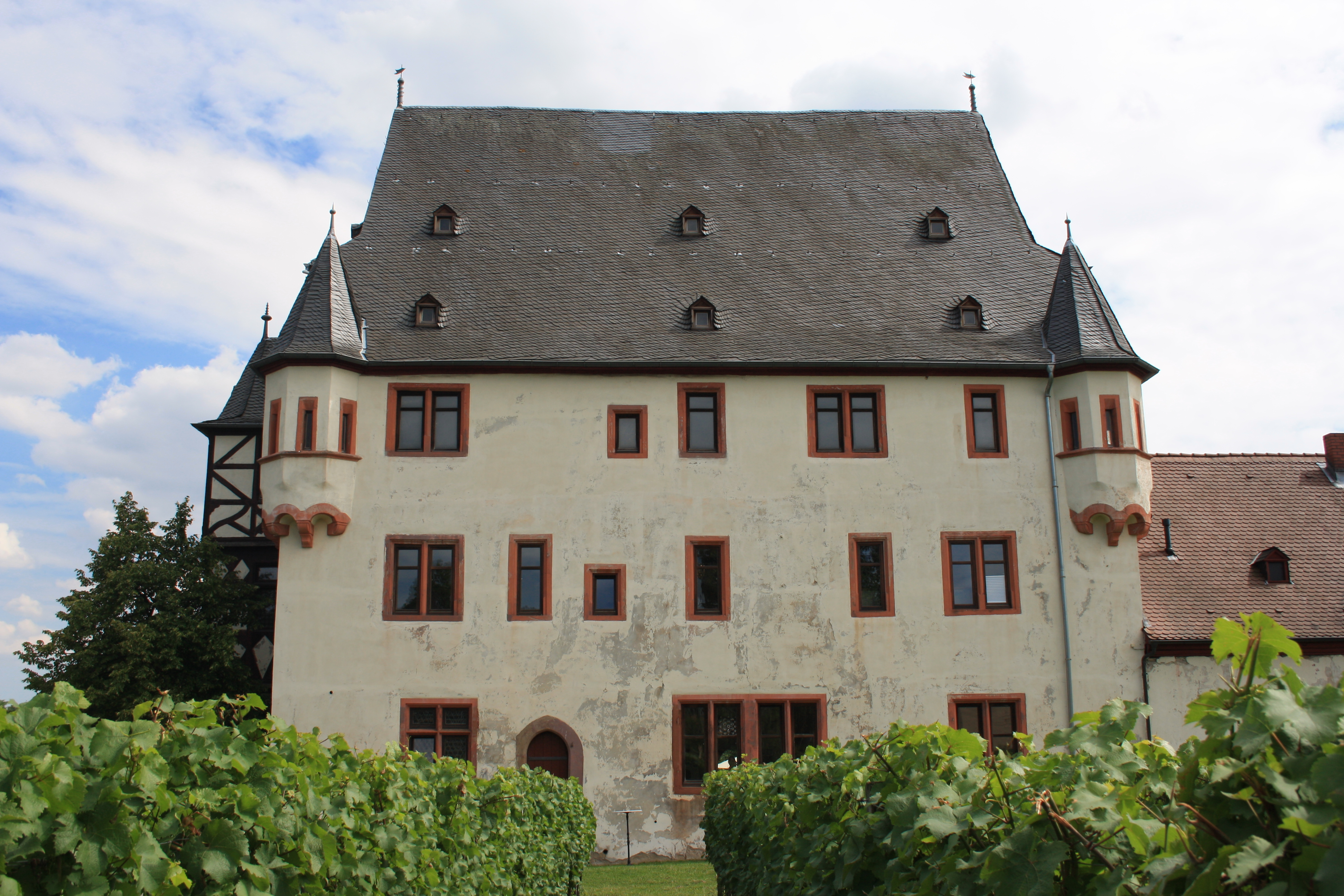
Wine estate of the Counts of Schönborn at Geisenheim

Resembling a cathedral, the gothic church Heilig Kreuz (Holy Cross) was finished by twin-towers only in the 19th century, similar to the cathedral in Cologne, and is therefore also called Rheingauer Dom. The architect of the neo-gothic facade and the towers was Philipp Hoffmann who also built landmarks in Wiesbaden. Nave and quire from the early 16th century, important tombs and rich interior décor and the rare Stumm organ from the romantic period make it worth seeing.

At the Pfefferzoll (“Pepper Toll”), ships sailing by town were once charged a toll on what was then a valuable spice. The little house with the oriel window today stands more than 200 m from the Rhine in the southeast Old Town.

Furthermore, there is the Evangelical church, built in the Romanesque Revival style about 1897.

==== Palaces ====
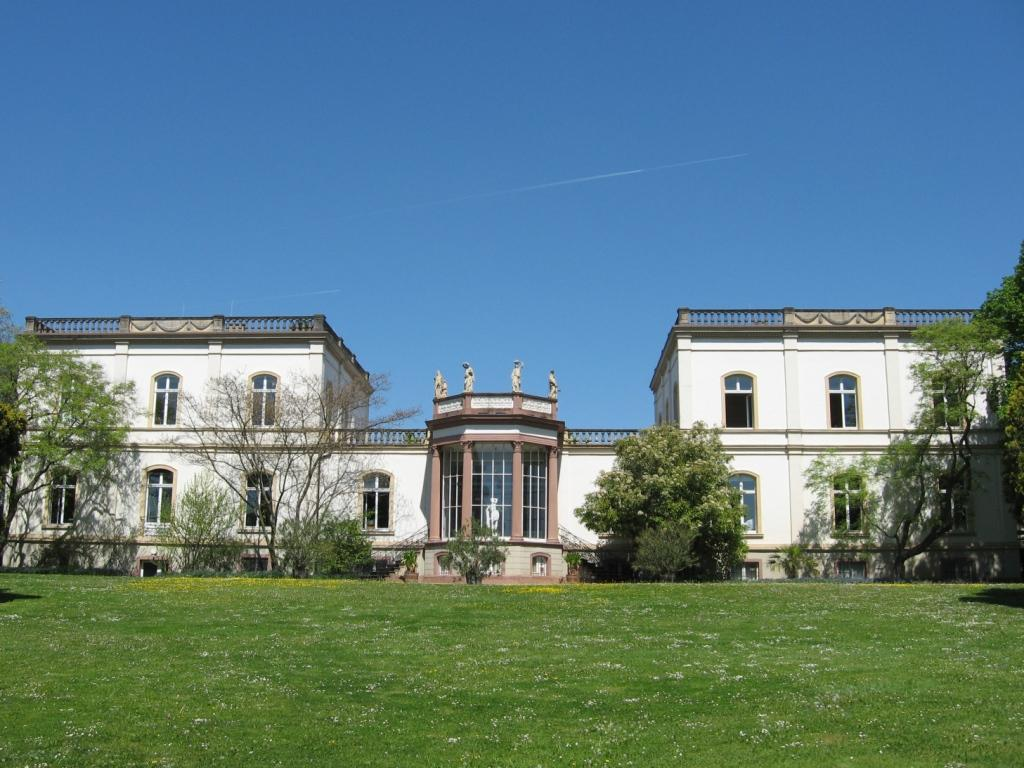
Villa Monrepos

In the town's east and west stand old palaces.

Schloss Schönborn from 1550 stands at the railway station in the middle of an enclosed vineyard and is a popular spot for photographers. This palace today still belongs to the Counts of Schönborn-Wiesenheidt. Great parts of the palace complex, however, are in a bad state.

Other palaces:

- Palais Ostein, a horseshoe-shaped complex from the 18th century, about 1815 the grand middle building was abandoned owing to a division of the estate. Today owned by the St. Ursula-Schule.
- Villa Monrepos, representative building in a great park, builder: Eduard von Lade (founder of the Geisenheim Grape Breeding Institute), built in the 19th century.
- Schloss Kosakenberg (formerly Ingelheim), complex above the railway station, from the 17th century, today a winery, restaurant and music school.
- Zwierleinsches Palais, standing above Schloss Kosakenberg, after many conversions, it today serves as a multiple dwelling; the Baroque park has given way to a housing estate.

=== Sport ===
- Rheingaustadion with grass playing field and plastic athletics complex (Kellersgrube)
- Rheingaubad (indoor swimming pool, together with Rüdesheim and the district)

=== Regular events ===
- Rheingau Musik Festival at Schloss Johannisberg, in the Rheingau Cathedral (and in the whole Rheingau)
- Second weekend in July: Geisenheimer Lindenfest with the Stunde der Heimat
- First weekend in September: Geisenheim Grape Breeding Institute's Tage der offenen Tür (“Open-Door Days”)

== Economy and infrastructure ==
=== Transport ===
Running by Geisenheim is Bundesstraße 42 linking Wiesbaden with Koblenz. On the Right Rhine railway, Wiesbaden can be reached within 30 minutes, or in about an hour on the regional bus.

Since 2007, the Köln-Düsseldorfer Rheinschiffahrt, a well known Rhine passenger ship concern, has linked the centres of Marienthal, Johannisberg and Stephanshausen with Geisenheim.

There is even a landing stage for small, private boats without a set route plan.

=== Education ===
Geisenheim has its cluster of schools to thank for its reputation as a school town:

- Geisenheim primary school and Hauptschule
- St. Ursula-Schule (private, Catholic Gymnasium)
- Internatsschule Schloss Hansenberg (boarding school), school for exceptional students
- Rheingauschule (Gymnasium)
- Vocational schools with, among other things, Handelsschule and Fachoberschule
- Berufliche Schulen Rheingau, Geisenheim (vocational school)
- Leopold-Bausinger-Schule (special school)
- Geisenheim municipal library

Since 1872, Geisenheim has been home to the Geisenheim Grape Breeding Institute for winegrowing and horticulture. In 1894 the Geisenheim Yeast Breeding Center was founded.

In Johannisberg is found Schloss Hansenberg. Since 2003, it has been an Oberstufengymnasium for especially well performing students.

== Famous people ==
=== Sons and daughters of the town ===
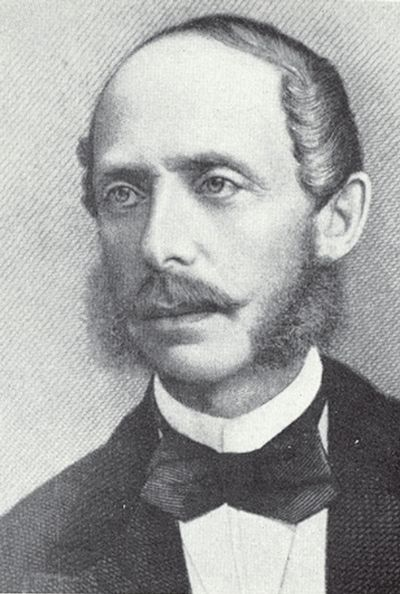
Heinrich Eduard von Lade

- Jakob Christmann, (1554–1613), Orientalist, born in Johannisberg
- Philipp Hoffmann, (1806–1889), architect and building master
- Peter Josef Blum, (1808–1884), Bishop of Limburg
- Heinrich Eduard von Lade, (1817–1904), banker, diplomat, gardener and plant cultivator as well as amateur astronomer. Founder of the Geisenheim Grape Breeding Institute, Geisenheim's first honorary citizen
- Gustav Dresel, (1818–1848), writer
- Lorenz Werthmann, (1858–1921), founder of Caritas
- Peter Spring, (1882–1945 in Dachau concentration camp), gardener, learned fruit-growing technologist, social democrat and pacifist
- Hans Burgeff, (1883–1976), botanist
- Gustav Gundlach, (1892–1963), Catholic social ethicist, social philosopher and social scientist
- Helmut Becker, (1927–1990), grape cultivator and lecturer.

=== People associated with the town ===
- Heinrich Birk (1898–1973), winegrowing expert, died in Geisenheim
- Franz Schramm (1887–1966), Hessian minister of culture 1946–1947
- Franz Josef Jung (born 1949), politician (CDU), jurist, defence minister 2005–2009 and former student at the Rheingauschule
