= Michael Herrmann =

German culture and music administrator (born 1944)

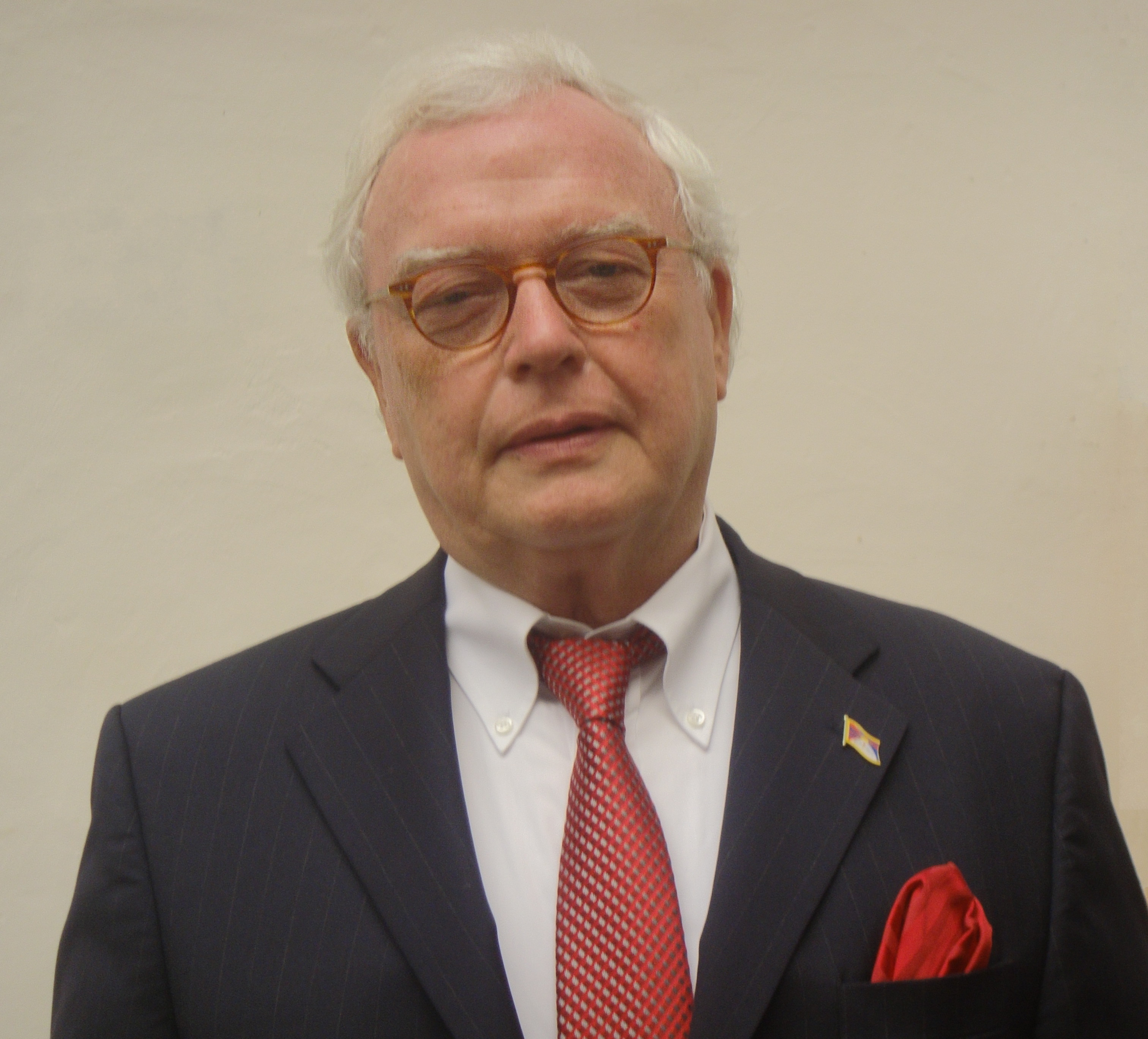
- The founder of the Rheingau Musik Festival at Eberbach Abbey, 23 August 2011
- Born: 4 February 1944 (age 81); Wiesbaden, Germany
- Occupation(s): culture and music administrator
- Organizations: Rheingau Musik Festival; European Festivals Association; Pro Arte Konzertdirektion

Michael Herrmann (born 4 February 1944) is a German culture and music administrator. He founded the Rheingau Musik Festival in 1987 and is its Artistic Director and Chief Executive Officer. He also runs a concert agency in the Frankfurt Alte Oper, the Pro Arte Konzertdirektion, and started an agency for concerts in the Kurhaus Wiesbaden in 2019, Wiesbaden Musik, beginning with a concert on his 75th birthday.

== Career ==
Herrmann was born in Wiesbaden where he grew up. When Herrmann announced in 2011 the first concert of the Rheingau Musik Festival's annual composer's portrait, featuring Hans Zender, he recalled that he was an altar boy at the church in Wiesbaden where Zender was the organist. In the 1960s, Herrmann attended the Pablo Casals Festival in Prades three times. Meeting important chamber musicians there, later singing in choral concerts in Eberbach Abbey in the early 1970s, inspired the idea of a music festival in the Rheingau, using the many culturally interesting venues of the area.

Herrmann, who first learned bookselling, turned to tourism and real estate and worked in the Canary Islands for ten years. He met Christoph Eschenbach, Justus Frantz, Jürgen Ponto, Helmut Schmidt, Will Quadflieg and Leonard Bernstein. He returned to Germany in 1982 and worked for concert agencies. In 1985 he founded his own artists and concert agency.

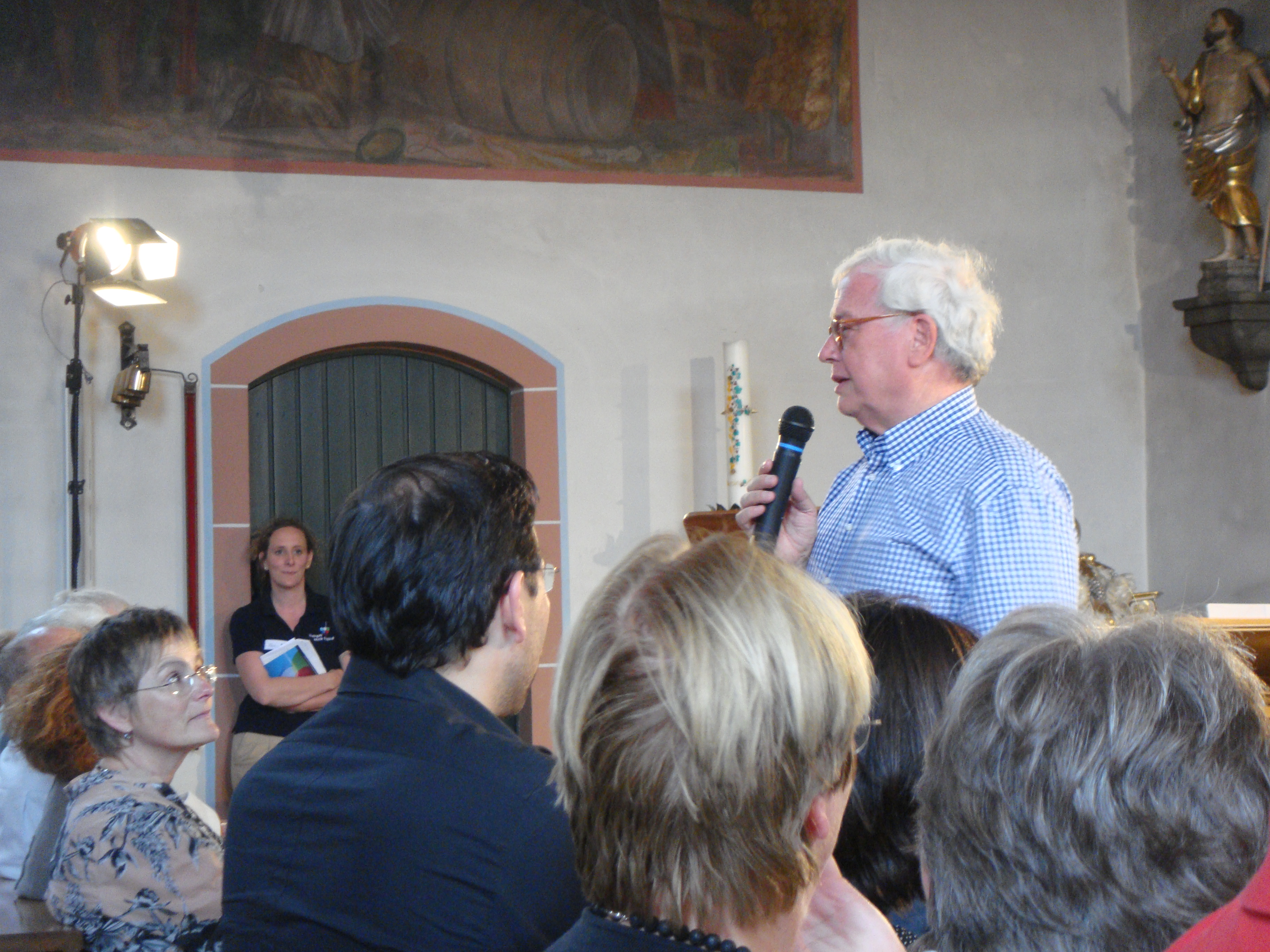
Herrmann announcing a concert by Andreas Scholl and members of the Baroque orchestra Accademia Bizantina at the church of Hallgarten, 16 July 2011

He founded the Rheingau Musik Festival in 1987, with a first season in the summer 1988 of 19 concerts, together with Tatiana von Metternich, Walter Fink, Claus Wisser and others. He had been advised by Walter Wallmann, then minister-president of Hesse, to better avoid the busy Rhein Main area and begin a festival in the Rhön where it would be supported by Zonenrandförderung. Although the first season was no financial success, Wisser encouraged Herrmann to keep going.

The founders created an association which ran the festival until 1992, and has continued to support the festival. In 2010, it had 3300 members. Herrmann won sponsors who choose to fund concerts of their choice. It is normal for him to contact three to four sponsors a day. 180 companies have sponsored the festival. About half of the budget is funded by the sponsors and the remainder by ticket sales. Herrmann was successful in keeping the festival independent of public funding, but the minister-president of Hesse is traditionally its patron. Since 1992 the festival has been run by a GmbH (company with limited liability), with Herrmann as partner and managing director (Gesellschafter und Geschäftsführer). The festival has grown from 19 concerts in the two months of the first season to an average of 150 events each season, many of them in the Rheingau's vineyards and historical buildings, making the festival "one of the largest in Europe". Herrmann made the festival a member of the European Festivals Association and serves as the association's vice president.

The program is mostly dedicated to classical music, but also features cabaret, jazz, readings, musical cruises, children's concerts, wine tastings and culinary events with music. It is regularly opened by a symphony concert in Eberbach Abbey, broadcast live by Hessischer Rundfunk. Anniversaries of composers are celebrated, such as Giuseppe Verdi ("Viva Verdi") in 2001, and Franz Liszt and Gustav Mahler in 2011. Every year it has a theme, such as "Heimweh" in 2011. "Treffpunkt Jugend" (meeting point youth) presents soloists still in their teens in two marathon concerts of chamber music and concertos with orchestra. Work cycles, running over several years, have included the piano sonatas of Ludwig van Beethoven, played by Rudolf Buchbinder, and the symphonies of Anton Bruckner, with the WDR Symphony Orchestra Cologne and Eliahu Inbal. "Rendezvous" shows artists in dialogue. In the Rheingau, a traditionally Catholic region, the feast of the Assumption is celebrated on 15 August by a Marienvesper (Vespers for the Virgin Mary). In 2011 the Concerto Romano ensemble, conducted by Alessandro Quarta, performed a medley of works by composers from Rome. On this occasion, Herrmann asked for an exceptional collection to benefit his guest of honor, bishop Ambroise of the diocese of Maradi in Niger. Organ concert on the historic instruments of the region are featured regularly. "Komponistenporträt" features annually a living composer in conversation, chamber music and symphonic music.

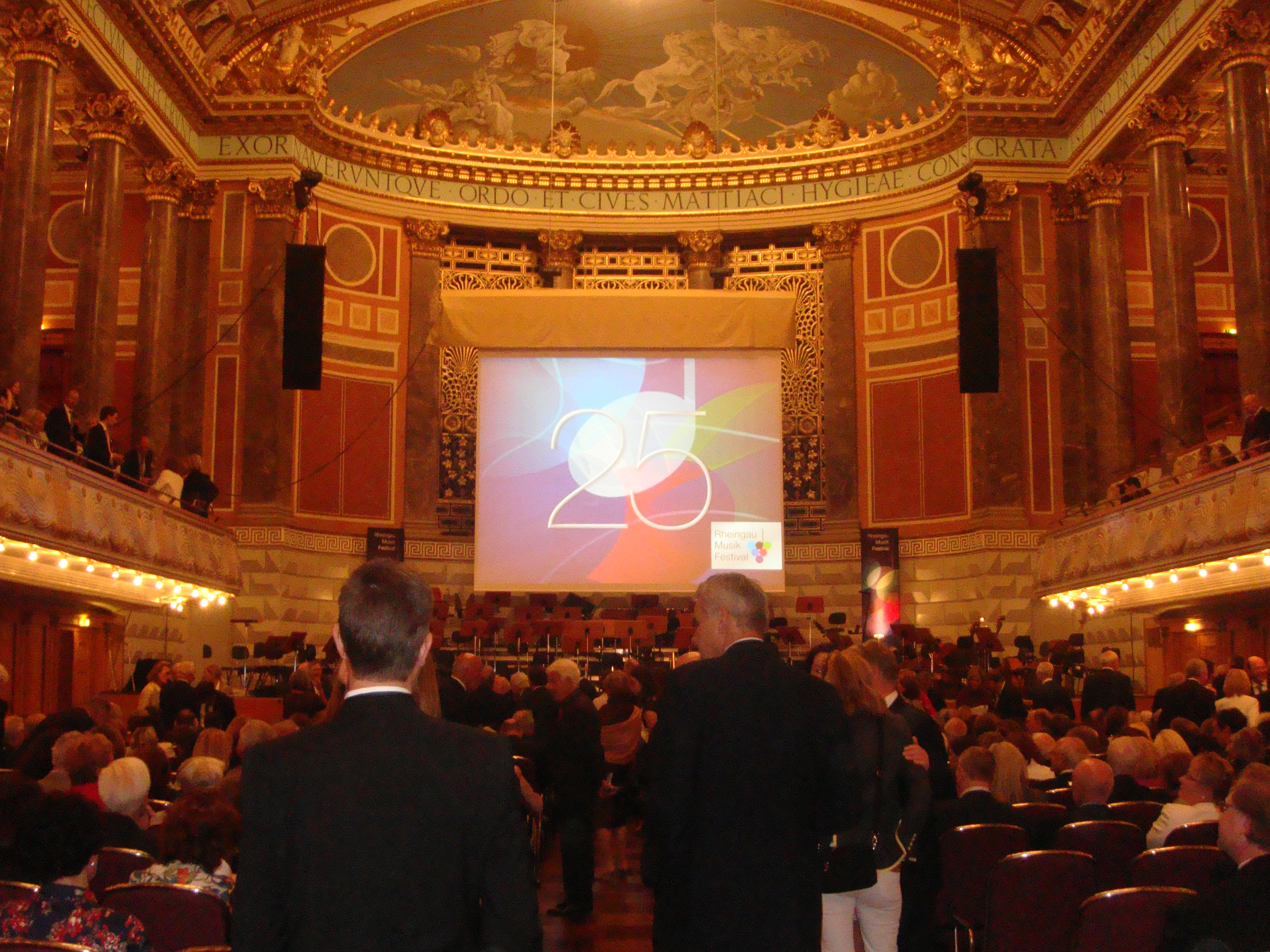
25 years RMF, celebrated in the Kurhaus, Wiesbaden on 17 June 2012

Herrmann got Anne-Sophie Mutter to perform the German premiere of Wolfgang Rihm's violin concerto Lichtes Spiel, premiered in Avery Fisher Hall in 2010. He gave Andreas Scholl, born in the Rheingau, the opportunity to perform with friends and his sister Elisabeth in several of the area's historic churches on one day. The festival usually concludes with a choral concert in Eberbach Abbey, including rarely performed works. In 2005 Frieder Bernius conducted Penderecki's Polish Requiem, Helmuth Rilling conducted Messa per Rossini in 2001 and Messiah of both Sven-David Sandström and Handel in 2009.

In the 25th anniversary season, he invited several of his long-term friend, called "Wegbegleiter" ("Companions along the way"), to appear again. In 2013, 160 events were offered at 45 locations, with a budget of 7,6 million Euro.

Since 2005 Herrmann has been vice president of the European Festivals Association. Since 2008 he has been director of the Pro Arte Konzertdirektion in Frankfurt. In 2019, he began a concert agency, Wiesbaden Musik for concerts in the Kurhaus Wiesbaden. The first concert on his 75th birthday was played by the Bamberger Symphoniker, a program of late Mozart symphonies, in G minor and C major, and Mendelssohn's Violin Concerto.

== Awards ==
In 1997 Herrmann was awarded the Hessian Order of Merit, and in 2002 received the Goethe Plaque, the highest award of the Hessian Ministry for Science and the Arts.
