= Rheingau Musik Festival =

International music festival in Germany

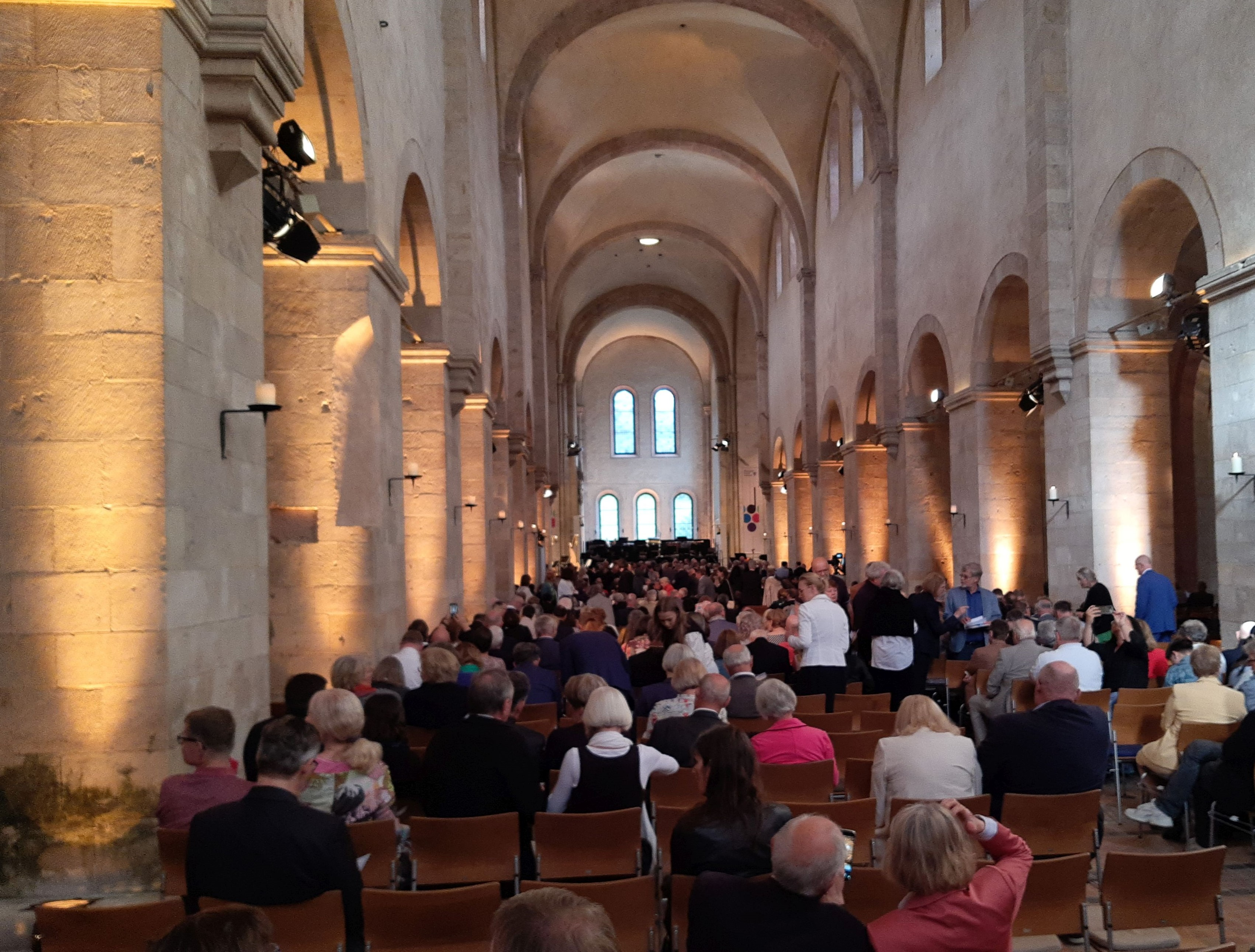
- Eberbach Abbey before opening concert, 2024
- Genre: mostly classical music
- Begins: end of June
- Ends: end of August
- Frequency: annual
- Locations: Rheingau, many locations
- Inaugurated: 1987; 39 years ago
- Participants: 159 events in 2013
- People: Michael Herrmann; Tatiana von Metternich; Walter Fink; Hans Otto Jung; Claus Wisser
- Member: European Festivals Association
- Website: www.rheingau-musik-festival.de

The Rheingau Musik Festival (RMF) is an international summer music festival in Germany, founded in 1987. It is mostly for classical music, but includes other genres. Concerts take place at culturally important locations, such as Eberbach Abbey and Schloss Johannisberg, in the wine-growing Rheingau region between Wiesbaden and Lorch.

== Initiative and realisation ==
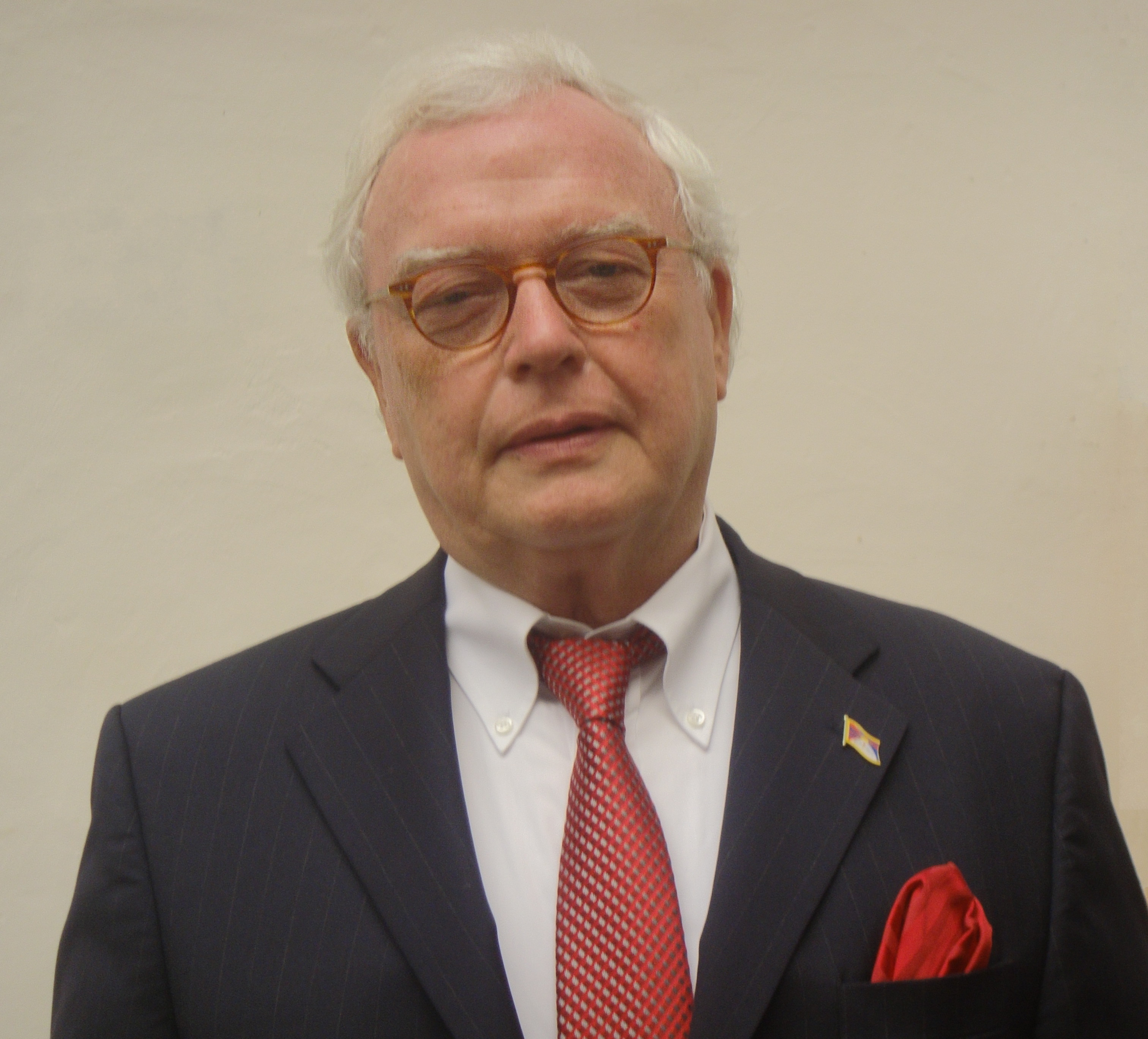
Michael Herrmann, founder and director, 23 August 2011

The festival was the initiative of Michael Herrmann, who has served as its artistic director and chief executive officer. Like the Schleswig-Holstein Musik Festival founded in 1986, the Rheingau festival was intended to add life to a region rich in musical heritage. The gothic church of Kiedrich houses the oldest playable organ in Germany, and has its own "dialect" of Gregorian chant that dates back to 1333. In more recent times, the Rheingau has inspired composers such as Johannes Brahms, who composed his Symphony No. 3 in Wiesbaden and frequently stayed in Rüdesheim, and Richard Wagner, who worked on Die Meistersinger von Nürnberg in Biebrich.

To test the festival idea, two concerts took place in Eberbach Abbey in the summer of 1987. In November 1987 the Rheingau Musik Festival e. V. was founded by Michael Herrmann, Tatiana von Metternich-Winneburg, Walter Fink, Hans Otto Jung, Michael Bolenius, Hans-Clemens Lucht, Ulrich Rosin and Claus Wisser. The association organized the festival from the first season in 1988 which included 19 concerts until 1992. It has continued to support the festival since. The RMF receives significant financial help from sponsors who choose to fund their own concerts.

The Rheingau Musik Festival is under the patronage of the minister-president of Hesse. Michael Herrmann was awarded the Goethe-Plakette of Hesse in 2002.

The RMF has grown to be one of Germany's important festivals presenting around 140 events every summer with international orchestras, ensembles and soloists. It is a member of the European Festivals Association. For the 2023 season, 164 concerts at 29 locations were announced.

On 17 June 2012, the 25th anniversary of the festival was celebrated at the Kurhaus, Wiesbaden.

== Locations ==
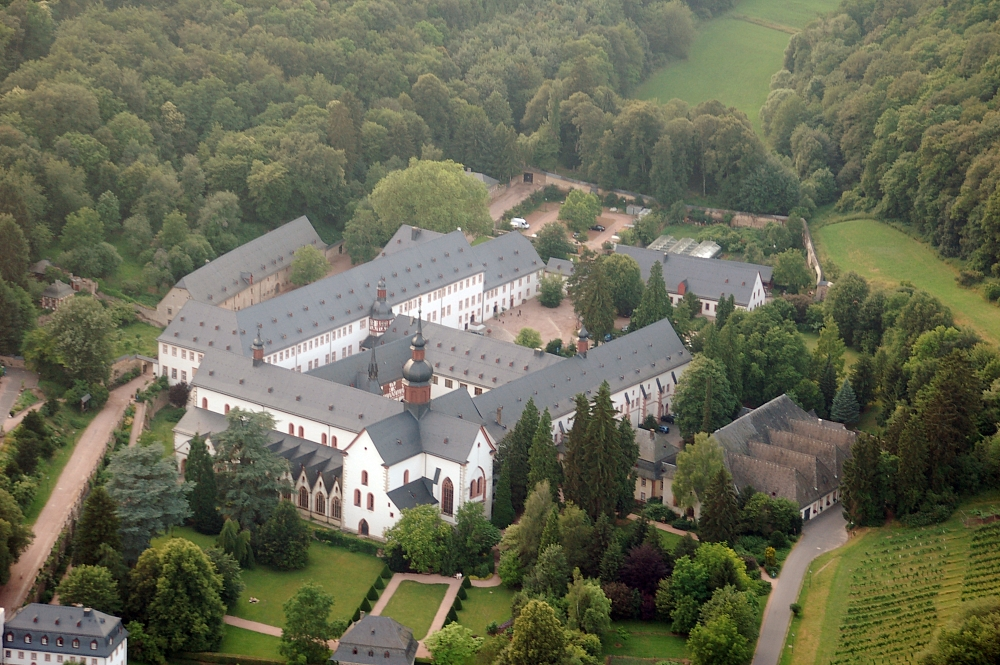
Eberbach Abbey (2006), venue for concerts of sacred music in the Basilika, chamber music in the Dormitorium and the Laiendormitorium, open-air concerts in the cloister

The concerts of the first season took place at Kloster Eberbach, in the hall and church of Schloss Johannisberg, at St. Martin in Lorch (part of the Rhine Gorge World Heritage Site), at the Rheingauer Dom in Geisenheim, and in Wiesbaden at the Marktkirche and the Kurhaus.

Important locations have also included Schloss Vollrads, the Abbey St. Hildegard in Eibingen, the churches St. Valentin in Kiedrich, the romanesque Basilika St. Aegidius of Mittelheim and St. Georg und Katharina in Wiesbaden-Frauenstein, the Parkhotel of the spa Schlangenbad, the Lutherkirche in Wiesbaden and the Alte Oper in Frankfurt am Main. Concerts have been staged in churches such as St. Jakobus, Rüdesheim, castles and former presshouses (Kelterhalle). An annual Sommerfest is held at Schloss Johannisberg while other open-air concerts have taken place in wineries and vineyards, on river boats, in the cloisters of Eberbach, the courts of Vollrads and the Kurpark Wiesbaden.

== Program ==
Most events are dedicated to classical music, but cabaret, jazz, readings, musical cruises, children's concerts, wine tastings or culinary events with music add to a diverse program.

=== Opening concert ===
The Rheingau Musik Festival is traditionally opened in Eberbach Abbey by a concert of the hr-Sinfonieorchester, broadcast live. The first concert was on 23 June 1988 a performance of two works by C. P. E. Bach, his Magnificat and the oratorio Die Israeliten in der Wüste. Frieder Bernius conducted the Kammerchor Stuttgart and the Barockorchester Stuttgart, with soloists Nancy Argenta, Lena Lootens, Mechthild Georg, Howard Crook and Stephen Roberts. A cycle of the symphonies of Gustav Mahler, conducted by Paavo Järvi, continued in 2011 with the Fifth Symphony, programmed with Alban Berg's Sieben frühe Lieder, sung by Elena Garanca. In 2013, Mahler's Sixth Symphony was preceded by Wagner's Wesendonck Lieder, sung by Anne Sofie von Otter. In 2016, Christoph Eschenbach conducted Schubert's Unfinished Symphony and Bruckner's Sixth Symphony The 2019 festival was opened by Dvořák's Stabat Mater, with the MDR Rundfunkchor and the hr Sinfonieorchester conducted by Andrés Orozco-Estrada.

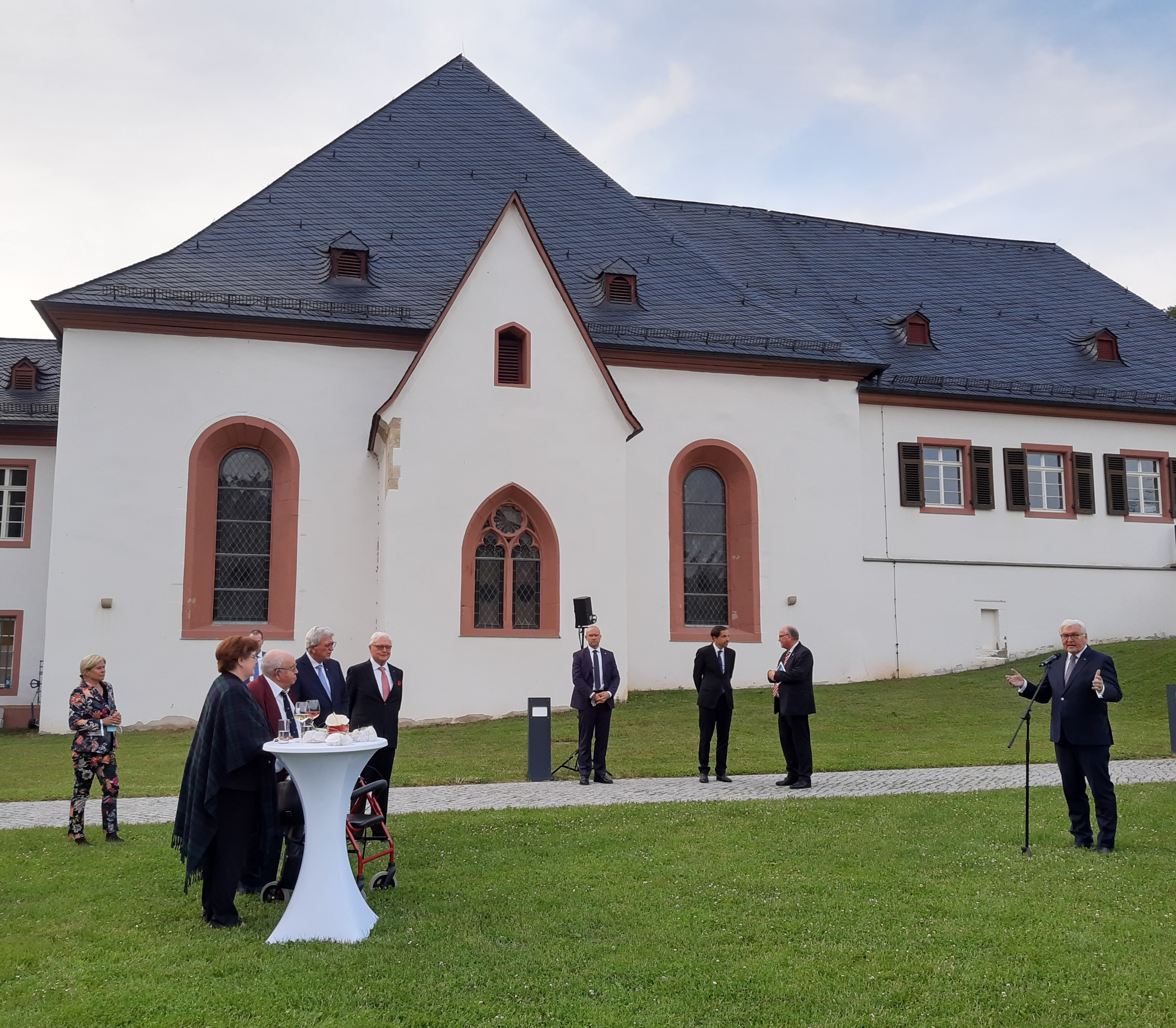
President Frank-Walter Steinmeier (right) addressing a group at his reception after the 2021 opening concert, with Volker Bouffier and Michael Herrmann listening

The 2020 festival had to be cancelled due to the COVID-19 pandemic. The 2021 festival was opened on 26 June, traditionally by the hr-Sinfonieorchester, and as the last program with Orozco-Estrada. Due to restrictions, the 650 listeners were placed like a checker board, 2 seats taken, and 2 seats empty; the program was played without intermission. Augustin Hadelich was the soloist in the Violin Concerto by Jean Sibelius, which was followed by Mendelssohn's Reformation Symphony. The concert was at the same time a charity concert of President Frank-Walter Steinmeier who spoke at the beginning with a focus on the support and encouragement of music students to follow their calling even in critical times. After the concert, he invited to a reception at various areas of the property, addressing each group there.

The opening concert in 2023 was focused on French music with the Te Deum by Berlioz, conducted by Alain Altinoglu, who conducted Gounod's St. Cecilia Mass with the MDR Rundfunkchor in a live-streamed concert in 2025.

=== Anniversaries ===
Every year, composers' anniversaries are celebrated. In 2009, six concerts were given each to music by Handel, including Israel in Egypt with the Monteverdi Choir under John Eliot Gardiner; by Haydn, including The Creation conducted by Enoch zu Guttenberg; and by Mendelssohn, including Elijah with the Collegium Vocale Gent under Philippe Herreweghe. In 2010, Robert Schumann and Frédéric Chopin were celebrated in 16 concerts, such as Das Paradies und die Peri and piano music by Chopin with Daniel Barenboim. Seven concerts were devoted to Mahler and Hugo Wolf, such as Spanisches Liederbuch. Christian Gerhaher and Gerold Huber performed Mahler's Sieben Lieder aus letzter Zeit (Seven Songs of Latter Days) and songs from Das Lied von der Erde. In 2011 they performed the composer's Lieder eines fahrenden Gesellen, Des Knaben Wunderhorn and Kindertotenlieder.

2014 remembers three anniversaries of birth, 450 of Shakespeare, 300 of C.P.E. Bach and 150 of Richard Strauss. Bach's oratorio Die Auferstehung und Himmelfahrt Jesu was performed by Hermann Max conducting the Rheinische Kantorei and Das Kleine Konzert, with soloists Veronika Winter, Markus Schäfer and Matthias Vieweg.

=== Theme ===
Every year, some concerts are grouped around a theme; in 2010, Fernweh, in eight concerts, including one of the ensemble amarcord, in 2011 the opposite: Heimweh. The theme of 2014 was Liebespaare (Lovers).

The theme of 2016, Starke Frauen (Strong women), was expressed in a concert of Mad Songs of the time of English restoration, performed by Dorothee Mields and the Lautten Compagney, combining folk songs and art songs mostly by Henry Purcell.

In 2023, the festival announced themes including works by Gustav Mahler, Bach's Goldberg Variations and Stravinsky's Le Sacre du Printemps, both these works in several interpretations.

=== Treffpunkt Jugend ===
Soloists still in their teens are presented at the regular series Treffpunkt Jugend (meeting point youth). They play in two Marathon concerts chamber music and concertos with orchestra.

=== Work cycles ===
Some performances are presented over several years, such as the piano sonatas of Ludwig van Beethoven by Rudolf Buchbinder. From 2003 to 2011, Eliahu Inbal conducted a series of the complete symphonies of Bruckner at Eberbach Abbey with the WDR Symphony Orchestra Cologne, concluding with the unfinished Ninth Symphony.

=== Marienvesper ===
Every year on 15 August the Assumption of Mary is celebrated by a Marienvesper (Vespers for the Virgin Mary), in 2010 Monteverdi's Vespro della Beata Vergine was performed to mark the 400th anniversary of the work, with the RIAS Kammerchor and the Akademie für Alte Musik Berlin, conducted by Hans-Christoph Rademann. In 2011 the ensemble Concerto Romano, conducted by Alessandro Quarta, performed a combination of works by composers from Rome, Vincenzo Ugolini (Laudate pueri), Paolo Tarditi (c.1580–1661, Lauda Jerusalem), Domenico Massenzio (d.1650, "Ave maris stella"), and in particular Lorenzo Ratti (c.1589–1630). In 2013 Monteverdi's Vespers were performed again, this time by the ensemble amarcord with additional singers, and the Lautten Compagney conducted by Wolfgang Katschner.

=== Organ concert ===
Organ concerts have been played on the historic instruments of the region by organists such as Marie Claire Alain, Gabriel Dessauer, Edgar Krapp, Ignace Michiels and Latry.

=== Rendezvous ===
In 2010 a new series started, presenting artists before their concerts in a separate Rendezvous: Christoph Eschenbach, the percussionist Martin Grubinger and Menahem Pressler. The guests in 2011 were Andreas Scholl and Christian Gerhaher.

=== Portraits of living composers ===
A special feature of the RMF is the annual Komponistenporträt, the presentation of a living composer in talk and music. It was initiated by Walter Fink and has been sponsored by him. From the beginning in 1990 the core of this portrait has been the invitation of a composer for an interview with chamber music. The modern ESWE Atrium was a fitting venue, but since a larger audience got interested the talks were moved to Schloss Johannisberg. In later years more concerts were added, sometimes in different locations, sometimes showing the works of the featured composer in relation to other music, concentrating on large scale works since 2005. Some composers have played or conducted themselves.

- 1990 György Ligeti (in absentia)
- 1991 Mauricio Kagel
- 1992 Volker David Kirchner
- 1993 –
- 1994 Wilhelm Killmayer
- 1995 Wolfgang Rihm
- 1996 Dieter Schnebel
- 1997 Aribert Reimann
- 1998 Helmut Lachenmann
- 1999 Karlheinz Stockhausen
- 2000 Hans Werner Henze (in absentia)
- 2001 Krzysztof Penderecki
- 2002 Steve Reich
- 2003 Sofia Gubaidulina
- 2004 György Kurtág
- 2005 Arvo Pärt
- 2006 Henri Dutilleux
- 2007 Heinz Holliger
- 2008 Toshio Hosokawa
- 2009 Rodion Shchedrin
- 2010 Kaija Saariaho
- 2011 Hans Zender
- 2012 Péter Eötvös

Songs by Wolfgang Rihm on texts by Goethe were performed, juxtaposed with Goethe-settings by Schubert, by Christian Gerhaher and Gerold Huber on 3 August 2014, just before a performance at the Salzburg Festival. They included the second performance of Harzreise.

==== Composers in residence ====
- 2013 Fazıl Say
- 2014 Jörg Widmann
- 2015 Lera Auerbach

Beginning in 2013 a new format presents a composer in residence, first Fazıl Say, who was also awarded the Rheingau Musikpreis of 2013. He appeared in a Werkstadtkonzert (workshop concert) after preparing three compositions with seven students of the Musikhochschule Frankfurt. He introduced to the pieces and after each work answered questions from the audience. In two sonatas composed in 2012, with Turkish place names as movement titles, he played the piano, first a cello sonata in four movements, then a clarinet sonata in three movements, both including elements of Turkish music as well as jazz. The program ended with his wind quintet Op. 31.

Jörg Widmann, Composer and Artist in Residence in 2014, appeared four times, as a clarinet soloist in two chamber music concerts playing the clarinet quintets by Mozart and Brahms with the Arcanto Quartet and works by Stravinsky, Schumann and Bartók with his sister, Carolin Widmann, and Dénes Várjon, in a Rendezvous and a Werkstattkonzert with students of the Musikhochschule Frankfurt. In the workshop, he presented four of his chamber music works, playing in two of them, Fieberphantasie for string quartet, clarinet and piano, and a quintet for piano and winds, the scoring of Mozart's quintet K. 452. The other works were Air for horn solo, and the String Quartet No. 3 Jagdquartett.

The composer in residence of 2015 was Lera Auerbach, who performed her works as a pianist in several concerts, including a Werkstattkonzert (workshop concert) of chamber music with students of the Frankfurt Musikhochschule.

==== Artists in residence ====
- 2013 Sol Gabetta
- 2014 Frank Peter Zimmermann
- 2016 Isabelle Faust
- 2017 Igor Levit, Michael Wollny
- 2018 Annette Dasch
- 2019 Daniil Trifonov
- 2020 Cancellation Rheingau Musik Festival 2020
- 2021 Khatia Buniatishvili
- 2023 Sarah Willis, Daniel Hope, Sol Gabetta (again), Martin Grubinger
- 2026 Hayato Sumino

=== Closing choral concert ===
The festival usually concludes with a choral concert in Eberbach Abbey, including rarely performed works. In 2005 Frieder Bernius conducted Penderecki's Polish Requiem, Helmuth Rilling conducted Messa per Rossini in 2001 and works entitled Messiah by both Sven-David Sandström and Handel in 2009. The 2026 festival ended with Mendelssohn's Lobgesang, performed by the Dresdner Kreuzchor and the Dresden Philharmonic, conducted by Martin Lehmann.

== Artists ==
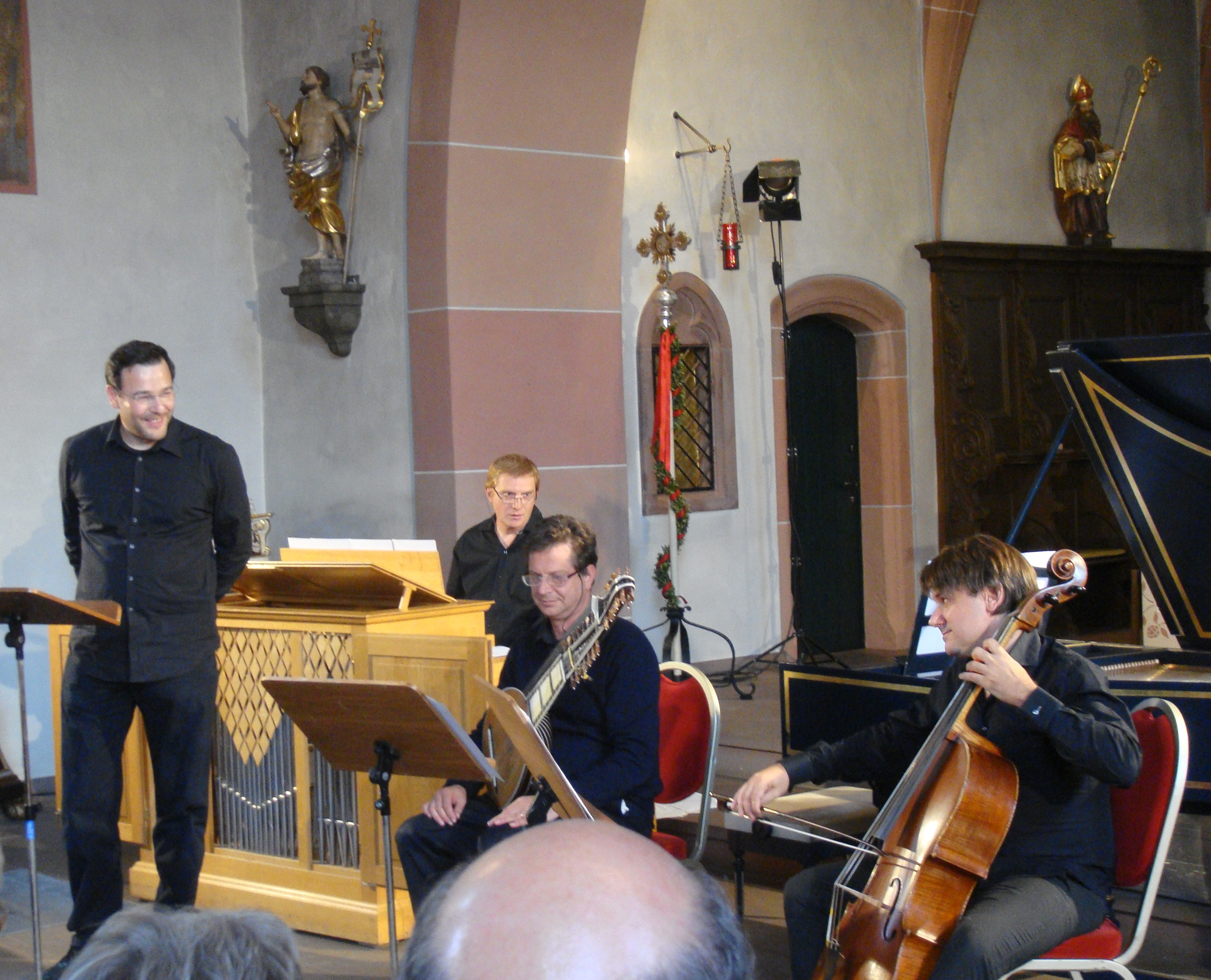
Andreas Scholl and members of the Baroque orchestra Accademia Bizantina in concert at the church of Hallgarten

Artists have included Anne-Sophie Mutter, Alfred Brendel, Mstislav Rostropovich, the Alban Berg Quartet, Zubin Mehta, and Riccardo Muti. Dietrich Fischer-Dieskau has appeared as a recitator, and Giora Feidman and Bobby McFerrin included their audience in their performance. In 2001, Dave Brubeck and his quartet appeared with the Jacques Loussier Trio. Chick Corea visited in 2009 and jammed with Roy Haynes, whose band had opened the concert. Other artists of 2009 included Colin Davis, Ludwig Güttler, Martha Argerich, Frank Peter Zimmermann, Anne Sofie von Otter and Olga Scheps. Lorin Maazel conducted the Vienna Philharmonic in Bruckner's Symphony No. 3 and Stravinsky's Le sacre du printemps.

In 2011, the Thomanerchor sang a concert of mostly motets, including Bach's Jesu, meine Freude in Eberbach Abbey, part of the choir's tour in its 800th year. Andreas Scholl, born in the Rheingau, made his debut at the festival in three events, an interview, a trip (Rheingaureise) to three churches with different concert programs, and an opera recital with his sister Elisabeth in Eberbach Abbey. The Lautten Compagney performed in concert Handel's opera Rinaldo, 300 years after its premiere. The ensemble Le Concert Spirituel, conducted by Hervé Niquet, performed music for up to 40 voices by Alessandro Striggio, together with music of Orazio Benevoli, Francesco Corteccia, Stefano Fabbri and Claudio Monteverdi. Other artists of 2011 included Freddy Cole, Yo-Yo Ma, Mitsuko Uchida, Waltraud Meier, Sabine Meyer, Heinrich Schiff, Frank Peter Zimmermann, Arabella Steinbacher, Daniel Müller-Schott, Xavier de Maistre, Omara Portuondo, Dianne Reeves, Nils Landgren, The King's Singers, the Münchner Philharmoniker with Olli Mustonen and Herbert Blomstedt, and the Windsbacher Knabenchor, among others.

In 2013, Andris Nelsons conducted the City of Birmingham Symphony Orchestra with soloist Sol Gabetta in a program including Elgar's Cello Concerto and Dvořák's Eighth Symphony.

In 2014, Maurizio Pollini made his debut at the festival, playing in the Kurhaus Wiesbaden Chopin's Preludes (Op. 28) and Book 1 of Debussy's Preludes.

== 25 years in 2012 ==
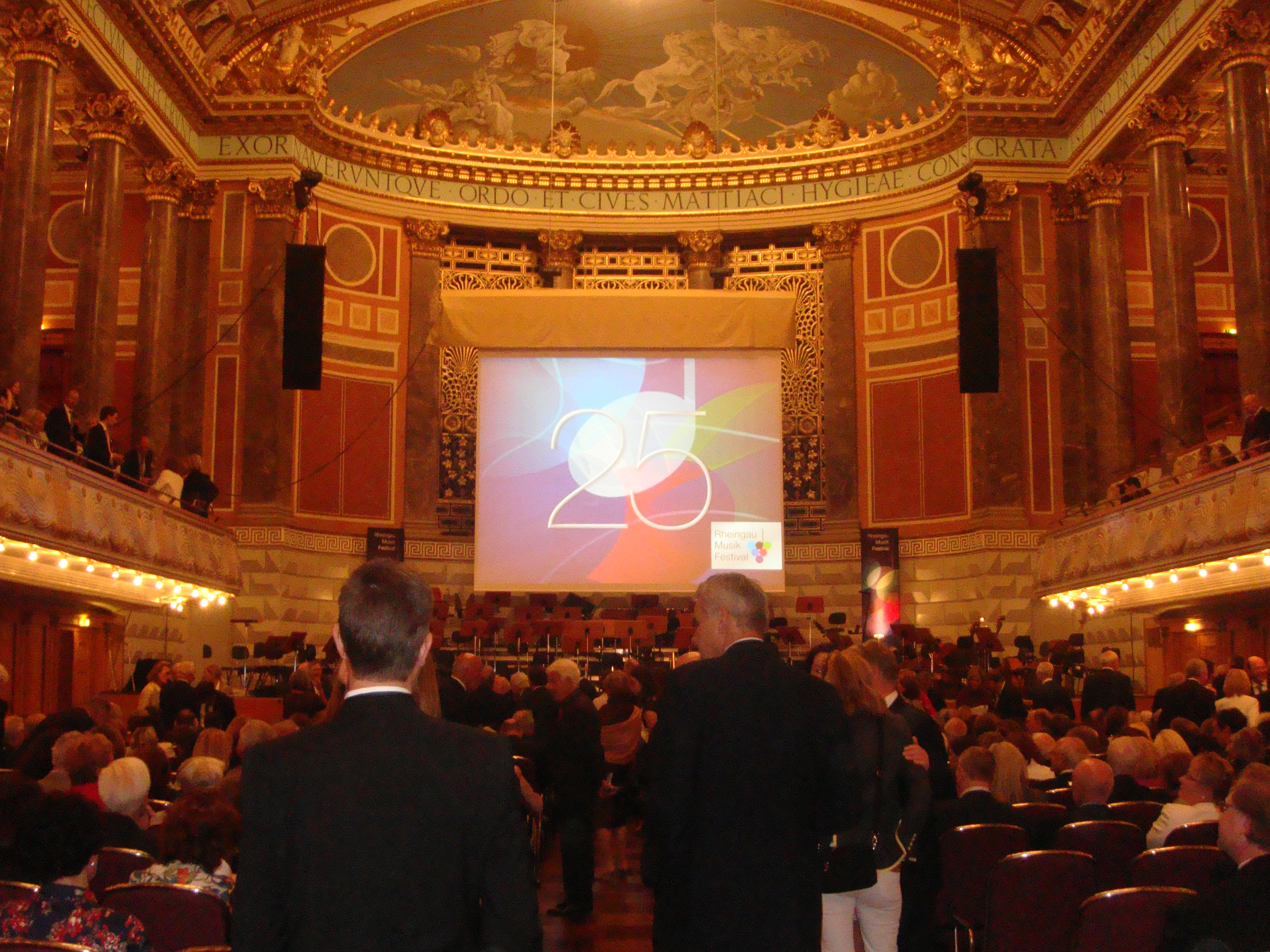
25 years RMF, Festakt on 17 June 2012 in the Kurhaus, Wiesbaden

On 17 June 2012, the 25th season of the festival was celebrated at the Kurhaus, Wiesbaden, with speeches by Volker Bouffier, Roland Koch and Enoch zu Guttenberg. A concert was played by the hr-Sinfonieorchester and violinist Frank Peter Zimmermann, conducted by Paavo Järvi.

The 25th season of the festival is celebrated by concerts of "Wegbegleiter" ("Companions along the way"), artists who have appeared regularly from the beginning, such as the Virtuosi Saxoniae, conducted by Ludwig Güttler, the Kammerchor Stuttgart, conducted by Frieder Bernius who had performed the very first concert of the festival, the piano duo Anthony & Joseph Paratore, the boys choir Windsbacher Knabenchor, percussionist Babette Haag, pianists Ewa Kupiec, Gerhard Oppitz, Justus Frantz, Tzimon Barto, Christoph Eschenbach and Oleg Maisenberg, actor Walter Renneisen, the Gächinger Kantorei and Bach-Collegium Stuttgart with Helmuth Rilling, and Enoch zu Guttenberg with his ensembles.

Other themes of the anniversary season were "Festmusiken" (Festive Music), "Geigenreigen" (Violin Circle) and "Orgeldimensionen" (Organ Dimensions). The Marienvesper was a sequence of works by Alessandro Melani, performed by Das kleine Konzert and the Rheinische Kantorei, conducted by Hermann Max, with soloists Veronika Winter, Franz Vitzthum, Hans Jörg Mammel and Markus Flaig, among others. The music was juxtaposed to Monteverdi's Il combattimento di Tancredi e Clorinda, with James Gilchrist.

== Rheingau Musik Preis ==
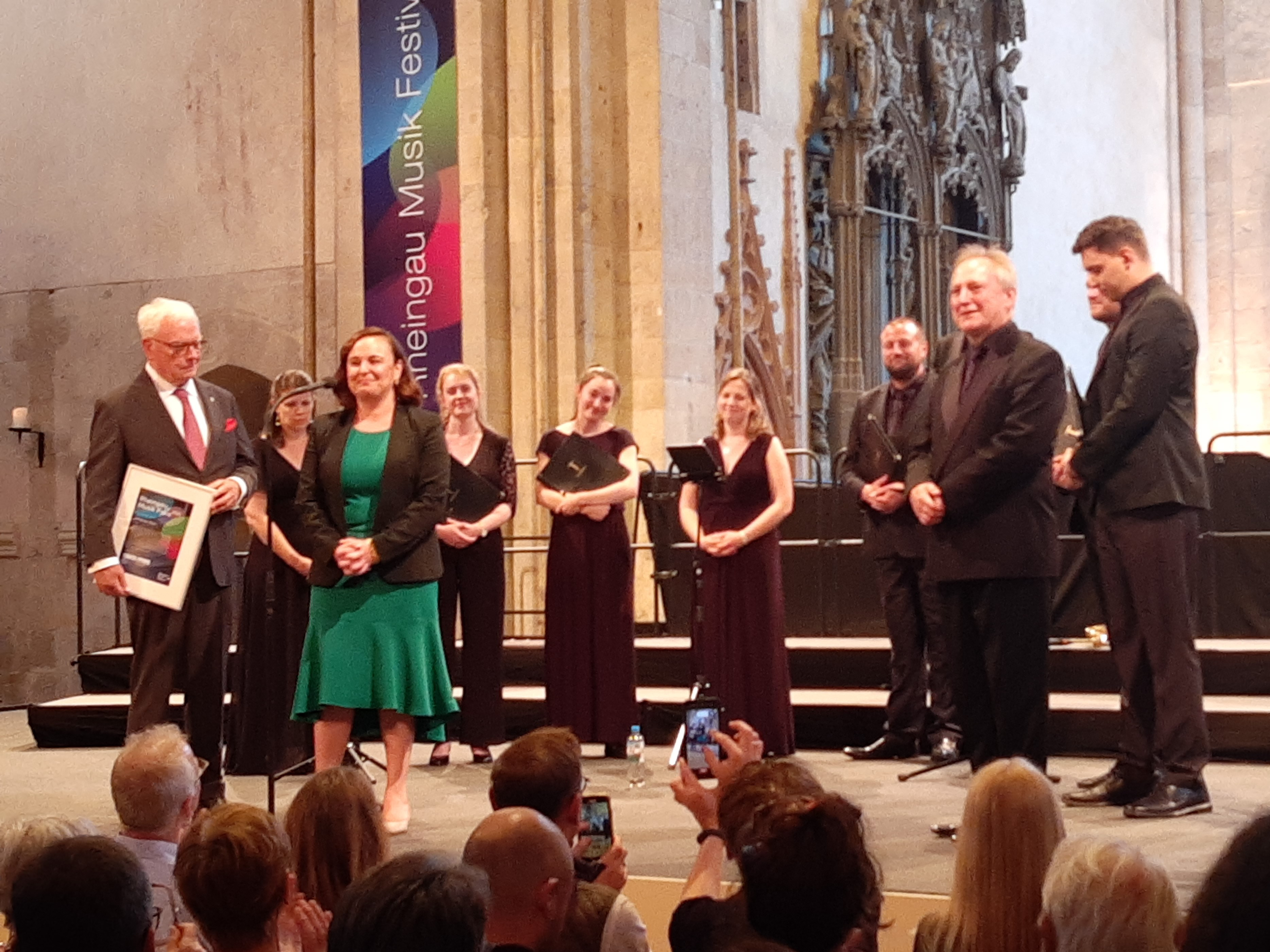
To Tenebrae in 2023

In 1994 the festival initiated the Rheingau Musik Preis that has been awarded annually for musical achievements, to

- 1994 Volker David Kirchner, composer
- 1995 Alexander L. Ringer, musicologist
- 1996 Gidon Kremer, violinist
- 1997 ensemble recherche, chamber ensemble for contemporary music
- 1998 Toshio Hosokawa, composer
- 1999 Tabea Zimmermann, viola player
- 2000 Helmuth Rilling, chorale conductor
- 2001 Artemis Quartet, string quartet
- 2002 Michael Quast, actor, cabarettist, comedian
- 2003 Stefan-Peter Greiner, violin maker
- 2004 Deutsche Gesellschaft für Musikphysiologie und Musikermedizin, Society for music in medicine
- 2005 Niki Reiser, composer of film music
- 2006 Hugh Wolff, conductor
- 2007 Windsbacher Knabenchor, boys choir
- 2008 Heinz Holliger, oboist and composer
- 2009 Christian Gerhaher, baritone
- 2010 Taschenoper Lübeck, opera company
- 2011 Bidla Buh, musical comedians
- 2012 Lautten Compagney, ensemble
- 2013 Fazıl Say, pianist and composer
- 2014 Christoph Eschenbach, conductor
- 2015 Andreas Scholl, singer
- 2016 Walter Renneisen, actor
- 2017 Enoch zu Guttenberg, conductor, and Chorgemeinschaft Neubeuern, choir
- 2018 Yannick Nézet-Séguin, conductor
- 2019 Deutsche Kammerphilharmonie Bremen, Paavo Järvi
- 2020 Daniel Barenboim and West–Eastern Divan Orchestra
- 2021 Nils Landgren
- 2022 Herbert Blomstedt
- 2023 Tenebrae
- 2024 Julia Fischer
- 2025 Thomas Quasthoff
- 2026 Rolando Villazón

== Broadcast and recordings ==
Many concerts have been conducted in collaboration with broadcasting stations, namely Hessischer Rundfunk. Selected events were recorded, including:

- Beethoven: Sonate f-moll, Schumann: Kreisleriana, Rachmaninoff: Prèludes et Etudes, Andreas Haefliger, 1994
- Canzoni & Concerti of Girolamo Frescobaldi, Claudio Monteverdi, Antonio Vivaldi, George Frideric Handel – Guillemette Laurens, Il Giardino Armonico, 1995
- Tschaikovsky: Manfred Symphony, Saint Petersburg Philharmonic Orchestra, conductor Yuri Temirkanov, live in Kurhaus Wiesbaden, 1997
- Dvořák: Biblical Songs op. 99, New World Symphony – Liliana Bizineche-Eisinger, Kölner Rundfunk-Sinfonie-Orchester, conductor: Gerd Albrecht, live in Kurhaus Wiesbaden, 1997
- Haydn: The Seasons, Anna Korondi, Markus Schäfer, Dietrich Henschel, Chorgemeinschaft Neubeuern; Orchester der KlangVerwaltung München, Enoch zu Guttenberg, Eberbach Abbey, 30 July 1998
- Charles Gounod: Mors et Vita, Barbara Frittoli, Lidia Tirendi, Zoran Todorovich, Davide Damiani, Budapest Radio Choir, hr-Sinfonieorchester, Marcello Viotti, 4 July 1999, Eberbach Abbey
- Carl Orff Carmina Burana – Annette Dasch, Gert Henning-Jensen, Zeljko Lucic, Orfeón Donostiarra, hr-Sinfonieorchester, conductor: Hugh Wolff, live in Eberbach Abbey, 2002
- Mahler: Symphony No. 2, Brigitte Geller, Iris Vermillion, Festival Chor und Orchester Stuttgart, Helmuth Rilling, 30 August 2003, Eberbach Abbey
- Handel: Messiah, Anna Korondi, Annette Markert, Werner Güra, Sebastian Noack, Cappella Istropolitana, Choir of the Bamberger Symphony, Rolf Beck, Eberbach Abbey, 21 August 2004
- Mozart: Great Mass in C minor, Version of Robert D. Levin, Diana Damrau, Juliane Banse, Lothar Odinius, Markus Marquardt, Gächinger Kantorei, Bach-Collegium Stuttgart, Helmuth Rilling, 2006
- Mahler: Symphony No. 3, Waltraud Meier, Limburger Domsingknaben, MDR Rundfunkchor, hr-Sinfonieorchester, Paavo Järvi, Eberbach Abbey, 23 June 2007
- Unergründliches Geheimnis (Enigmatic Secret), Sacred choral music of Brahms, Bruckner, Mendelssohn and Reger, Windsbacher Knabenchor, Marktkirche Wiesbaden, 18 July 2008
- Rheingau Musik Festival 2009, Best of Vol. III, Baiba Skride, Nikolaj Znaider, Alfredo Perl, Xavier de Maistre, Christian Gerhaher, Windsbacher Knabenchor, 2009
