= Claus Wisser =

German businessman and patron of the arts (1942–2023)

- Wisser, c. 2012
- Born: 30 June 1942; Wiesbaden, German Reich
- Died: 4 October 2023 (aged 81)
- Education: Goethe University Frankfurt
- Occupations: Businessman; philanthropist
- Organizations: Wisag; Rheingau Musik Festival
- Awards: Georg August Zinn Medal; Hessian Order of Merit; Order of Merit of the Federal Republic of Germany

Claus Friedrich Wisser (30 June 1942 – 4 October 2023) was a German businessman and philanthropist, a patron of music and the arts. He was head of the service company Wisag which he founded, and was chairman of its supervisory board since 2011, and honorary chairman of that board from 2022.

Wisser is also known as a founding member of the Rheingau Musik Festival, and chairman of its supporting association. He supported the Goethe University Frankfurt and museums, and founded a charity for children. He was twice a member of the Federal Convention to elect the German president.

== Life and career ==
Claus Wisser was born on 30 June 1942 in Wiesbaden, the son of a shopkeeper. He attended the Friedrich List School, and helped in the family shop from age 10. When he was age 14, his father had to close the shop, and young Claus took on several jobs during his time at the gymnasium. While still at school, he joined the SPD. He studied business administration at the University of Frankfurt, and took part in the first students' revolt, opposing the German Emergency Acts. He heard Carlo Schmid in public lectures at the university.

In 1965, Wisser founded a company for the cleaning of office buildings; he posted an advertisement seeking a used working typewriter as a gift. He began the company as its only employee, equipped with a broom, bucket, and the typewriter, dropping out of university soon after. The company grew to become Wisag, a business focused on cleaning, maintenance of parks, security, and catering, among others, with 50,000 employees. A short-lived venture into textiles was a failure, which left Wisser with a large amount of debt. He then focused again on providing services for industry, administration, airlines, and airports, especially the ground traffic for the latter. He stepped away from the company's operations during the 1990s, passing them on to executives including his son Michael Wisser, who became chairman of the company in 2007. Claus Wisser became chairman of the supervisory board, and became honorary chairman of the supervisory board from 2022.

In 1987, Wisser was one of the founding members of the Rheingau Musik Festival, together with Michael Herrmann, Tatiana von Metternich-Winneburg, Michael Bolenius, Hans-Clemens Lucht, and Ulrich Rosin, with Wisser serving as the treasurer. He succeeded Walter Fink as chairman of the Rheingau Musik Festival Förderverein, an association supporting the festival. In honor of his 60th birthday on 30 June 2002, the festival staged a performance of Carl Orff's Carmina Burana at Eberbach Abbey, with soloists Annette Dasch, Gert Henning-Jensen, and Željko Lučić, the choir Orfeón Donostiarra, and the hr-Sinfonieorchester conducted by Hugh Wolff, which was recorded.

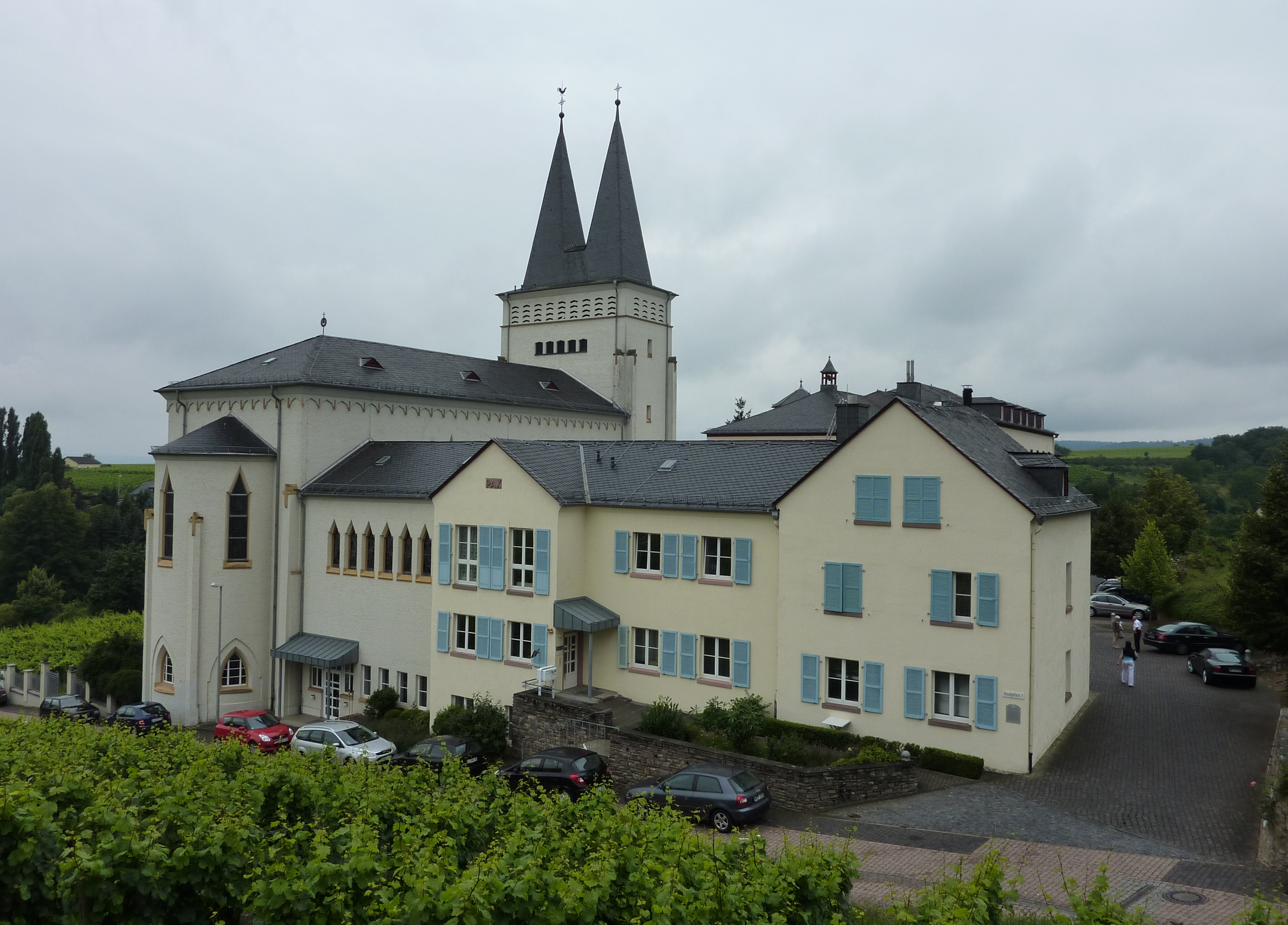
Neues Kloster Johannisberg, 2009

Wisser also sponsored the Städel museum and the Caricatura Museum Frankfurt, his former school, and the University of Frankfurt. He began a project to transform the former Neues Kloster Johannisberg into a hotel and event venue. In 2015, celebrating 50 years of Wisag, he founded together with his son the KiWIS foundation, a charity for children.

Wisser was a member of the Federal Convention for the election of the German Bundespräsident, in 1999 and in 2017.

Wisser died of cancer on 4 October 2023, at the age of 81.

Boris Rhein, Minister-President of Hesse, said: "In Claus Wisser verlieren wir eine Persönlichkeit, die sich vollends in den Dienst der Gesellschaft gestellt hat. Auf den Feldern Bildung, Kunst und Kultur hat er mit viel Herzblut gewirkt. Claus Wisser hatte immer ein offenes Ohr für Pläne und Projekte, die dem Wohl der Bürgerinnen und Bürger dienen. Er war stets bereit, nicht nur mit Rat und Tat zu helfen, sondern auch mit Ideen zur finanziellen Unterstützung." (In Claus Wisser, we are losing a personality who placed himself entirely at the service of society. He put his heart and soul into the fields of education, art and culture. Claus Wisser always had an open ear for plans and projects that served the welfare of the citizens. He was always ready to help not only with advice and action, but also with ideas for financial support).

== Awards ==
Wisser received awards for his exceptional social engagement and support of education, music, and the arts.

- 2005: Georg August Zinn Medal
- 2010: Hessian Order of Merit
- 2013: Ehrenplakette der Stadt Frankfurt am Main
- 2015: ULI Leadership Award
- 2021: Honorary citizen of the Goethe University
- 2022: Officer's Cross of the Order of Merit of the Federal Republic of Germany
