= Walter Fink =

German patron of music (1930–2018)

- Born: 16 August 1930
- Died: 13 April 2018 (aged 87); Wiesbaden
- Occupations: Entrepreneur; Patron of music
- Organizations: Rheingau Musik Festival; Center for Art and Media Karlsruhe
- Awards: Federal Cross of Merit

Walter Fink (16 August 1930 – 13 April 2018) was a German entrepreneur and a patron of contemporary classical music. He is known for being a founding member, executive committee member and sponsor of the Rheingau Musik Festival, where he initiated a series of annual portraits of international composers of contemporary classical music.

== Career ==
Fink was taught piano from the age of seven In Frankfurt he took organ lessons with Helmut Walcha and learned conducting with Kurt Thomas. He joined the company of his father in Wiesbaden as a young man and expanded it. He was Managing director of the Firmengruppe Fink (FINK Schuhe + Sport GmbH) in Wiesbaden until his retirement in 2002. He founded a church choir at the Christuskirche in Wiesbaden and served there for 25 years as organist.

In 1987 he was one of the founding members of the Rheingau Musik Festival, together with Michael Herrmann, Tatiana von Metternich-Winneburg, Claus Wisser, Michael Bolenius, Hans-Clemens Lucht and Ulrich Rosin. The advertising department of his company designed the logo for the festival. Fink was on the board of the Rheingau Musik Festival Förderverein, an association to support the festival, and was its president during the first years. He was a member the jury of the Rheingau Musik Preis, together with Rolf Beck (Artistic Director of the Schleswig-Holstein Musik Festival), Leo-Karl Gerhartz (retired Music Programme Director of the state broadcaster Hessischer Rundfunk and Peter Hanser-Strecker (Board Chairperson of Schott Music).

Fink received the Cross of the Order of Merit of the Federal Republic of Germany in 2007. He was Grand Officier of the Confrérie de la Chaîne des Rôtisseurs. On 19 October 2011 the Staatliche Hochschule für Gestaltung Karlsruhe granted him an honorary Doctorate of Philosophy.

=== Engagement for contemporary music ===
Musik entspannt, es sei denn, man hört zu". (Music is relaxing, unless one listens.)

— Walter Fink

Fink's interest in contemporary music was instilled in 1947 by Hindemith's opera Mathis der Maler. He supported the Internationale Ferienkurse für Neue Musik in Darmstadt. He was interested in premieres and a personal friend of composers; Wolfgang Rihm served as his best man. Several composers dedicated music to him, such as Volker David Kirchner, his piano quartet with clarinet Exil in 1995 and Toshio Hosokawa, Temple Bells Voice, from the last movement of his oratorio Voiceless Voice in Hiroshima in 2001.

For the Rheingau Musik Festival, Fink initiated in 1990 an annual Komponistenporträt, the presentation of a living composer and his or her work. Fink was the personal contact to the composers and a sponsor of the concert series, presenting the composers and their music: György Ligeti, Mauricio Kagel, Kirchner, Wilhelm Killmayer, Rihm, Dieter Schnebel, Aribert Reimann, Helmut Lachenmann, Karlheinz Stockhausen, Hans Werner Henze, Krzysztof Penderecki, Steve Reich, Sofia Gubaidulina, György Kurtág, Arvo Pärt, Henri Dutilleux, Heinz Holliger, Hosokawa, Rodion Shchedrin, Kaija Saariaho, Hans Zender and Péter Eötvös.

His 80th birthday was celebrated in a concert of the Rheingau Musik Festival at Schloss Johannisberg on 16 August 2010, with compositions of five composers including three premieres, works by Kirchner, Rihm, Hosokawa, Lachenmann and Jörg Widmann for clarinet, percussion, piano and saxophone. Among the works was Lachenmann's Sakura-Variationen. The title of Hosokawa's composition for soprano saxophone and piano, percussion ad libitum, is Für Walter – Arc Song II.

=== Walter-Fink-Award ===
Fink created, in collaboration with the Institut für Musik und Akustik of the ZKM Center for Art and Media Karlsruhe, the Walter-Fink-Award for electroacoustic music, dance and media. Fink sponsored it until 2012. The prize (€10,000) was awarded for the first time in 2009 to rosalie, Humberto Teixeira and Matthias Ockert.

=== Personal life ===
Fink was married to the soprano Renate Czsesla-Fink, who supported his work. He died in Wiesbaden on 13 April 2018 after a short illness, at the age of 87.
