= Babette Haag =

German percussionist

- Born: 31 October 1967 (age 57); Munich, West Germany
- Instrument(s): Percussion, marimba
- Website: www.magic-drums.com

Babette Haag (born 31 October 1967) is a German percussionist, who specialises in Marimba playing.

== Early life and education ==
Haag was born in Munich in 1967. Her parents were both professional musicians. Her mother is the harpist Gudrun Haag (née Diel) and her father is Wolfgang Haag, who played the flute for the Bavarian State Opera. She began to learn the piano when she was six and she came to notice when awards for playing piano duets with Natasha Schmidt. Haag gained a first prize with distinction for her rendering of Lutoslawski's Paganini Variations and Sergei Rachmaninoff's Suite for Two Pianos.

Haag says that her change of direction came about when she heard Peter Sadlo who was the percussion prize winner of the ARD Competition when she was seventeen. His performance persuaded her to specialise in percussion instruments. So after she enrolled at Munich's Pestalozzi–Gymnasium in 1987, she decided the following year to study classic percussion and timpani at the Musikhochschule Freiburg with Bernhard Wulff. Wulff is not only a composer and musicologist, but he is also a percussionist who organizes concerts. Haag competed in Deutscher Musikrat in 1991 and this gave her prize-winning entry to the 36th National Selection of "Concerts of Young People" the following season. Haag was at the Musikhochschule Freiburg until 1994.

== Concert career ==
Haag has performed in a large number of percussion recitals, concertos for marimba or percussion and orchestra. She made over 40 performances of her skills throughout Germany whilst she was still studying. She performed with the brothers and piano duet Anthony and Joseph Paratore and the Russian Alexei Lubimov. She has also appeared with the Symphony Orchestra of the Bayerischer Rundfunk, Württembergisches Kammerorchester Heilbronn, Dresdner Kapellsolisten. Frankfurter Museumsorchester, Philharmonie Thüringen, Musikcollegium Schaffhausen and the Polish Chamber Philharmonic Orchestra.

Haag has also been a guest at international music festivals and as a result she has travelled to the Baltic states, Arabia, Sudan, and not only North but also central and South America. She played at venues including the Staatstheater Oldenburg and festivals such as the Rheingau Musik Festival, Schleswig-Holstein Musik Festival, Ludwigsburger Schloßfestspiele and the Berliner Festwochen. In the 1,000th concert of the Weilburger Schlosskonzerte, she was chosen to appear with the Bachchor Mainz, Anthony and Joseph Paratore and her own ensemble. They played Rhapsody in Blue, Bartók's Sonata for Two Pianos and Percussion, and Carmina Burana.

In 2004 she appeared without her ensemble in Latin America where her solo performances were broadcast on the TV and radio including the Sala São Paulo which has been considered the "most prestigious series of concerts in Brazil". The following year she performed in Saudi Arabia and the next year saw her playing in Sudan as well as on board the German ship MS Europa on a cruise around the UK. Haag has also taught at universities in São Paulo and the Rio de Janeiro. She also appeared or taught at the College of Music and Drama in Khartoum, the Braunschweig Classix Festival and the Dresden Music Academy.
