= European Festivals Association =

The European Festivals Association (EFA) is an umbrella group for various festivals in Europe and other countries. It supports artistic cooperation among festivals and offers programs for new festival and artistic managers. It represents more than 100 music, dance, theatre and multidisciplinary festivals along with national festival and cultural organizations from about thirty eight, mostly European, countries.

== Overview ==
The association is officially headquartered in Ghent, Belgium with an office in Brussels in the European House for Culture. It is governed by a General Assembly, which meets once a year. The current president is Darko Brlek from Ljubljana. Vice presidents are Jan Briers from Flanders and Michael Herrmann, founder and director of the Rheingau Musik Festival.

== History ==
The association was established in 1952. Small towns and cities alike sponsor cultural festivals as a way to attract tourism, with about 400 in Europe alone, including the Edinburgh International Festival. The rapid growth of festival events since the 1980s has put pressure on the towns and cities that compete for public funding and competition for better known performers has raised their prices.

The association has more than seventy members. The oldest and best known member festival is the Edinburgh International Festival, which began in 1947. Its annual program features classical music, opera, theater and dance. International Festival Wratislavia Cantans is held in the Polish city of Wrocław focusing on oratorios and cantatas from Bach to Handel and their contemporary Pawel Mykietyn.

== Activities ==
For 2011, some of the projects include the Ars Nova meeting for new music experts in Belgium, a meeting of the Associations Collective and Affiliate Members, the General Assembly and Conference, the Ateliers for Young Festival Managers in Singapore and Izmir, Turkey, two new books to publish and joint projects with the European House for Culture in Brussels. The EFA is a source of information about more than 100 events, many lesser-known, and is based in the Chateau de Coppet near Geneva.

== See also ==
- Festival Republic
