= Werner Meißner =

German university professor and economist (1937–2025)

Werner (Richard) Meißner
- Born: 24 April 1937
- Died: 24 June 2025 (aged 88)
- Education: University of Cologne; Stanford University; Free University of Berlin
- Scientific career
- Fields: Economics
- Workplaces: Goethe University Frankfurt

Werner (Richard) Meißner (or Meissner; 24 April 1937 – 24 Juni 2025) was a German economist who served as president of the Goethe University Frankfurt from 1994 to 2000.

== Life and career ==
Meißner studied business administration and economics at the University of Cologne and Stanford University and earned a PhD in economics at the Free University of Berlin in 1964. He was a research assistant at the Department of development economics at the German Institute for Economic Research in Berlin from 1964 to 1965. He then continued his research in econometrics and statistics at Uppsala University and earned a habilitation in 1969. In 1971, he became professor of economics at the Goethe University, where economics and business administration were closely integrated within the same department, making his background in both fields a natural fit. He was also Managing Director of the Institute for Economic and Social Sciences (WSI) in Düsseldorf from 1992 to 1994. He served as president of the Goethe University from 1994 to 2000, during which his efforts led to the acquisition of the I.G. Farben Building, laying the foundation for today’s Westend Campus. He held visiting professorships at Stockholm University (1972–74), the University of Gothenburg (1974–75), the University of Vienna (1978–79 and 1982) and the University of Toronto (1990–91). He served as a consultant to the OECD in Paris, several UN agencies and the governments of Liberia, China and India. In 2023, he was awarded the Hessian Order of Merit.

Meißner died on 1 July 2025, at the age of 88.
