= Ina-Maria Greverus =

German university teacher (1929–2017)

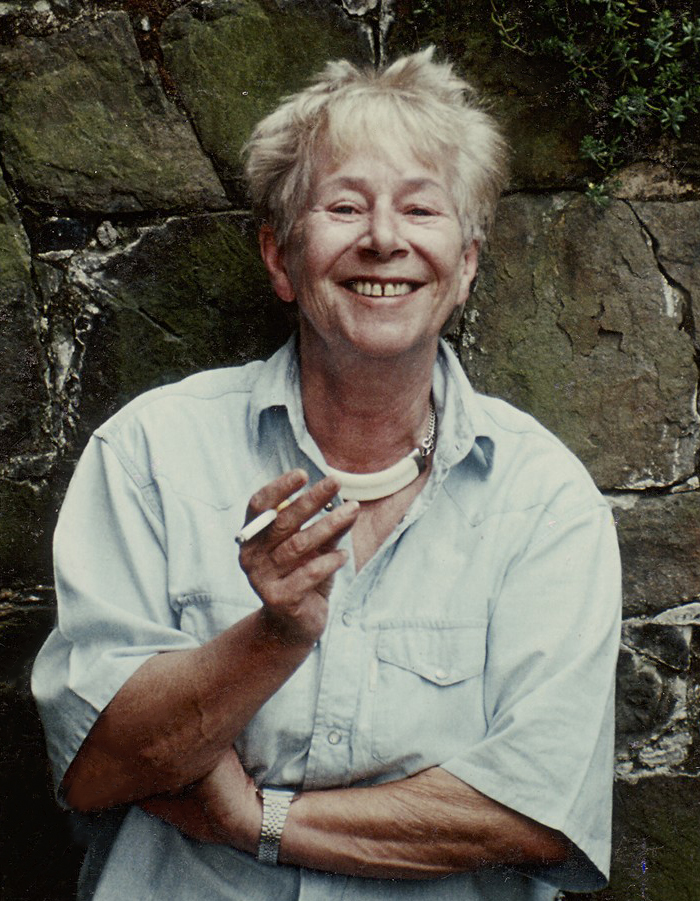
Image of Ina-Maria Greverus

Ina-Maria Greverus (16 August 1929 in Zwickau – 11 April 2017 in Frankfurt am Main) was a German folklorist and university lecturer in European ethnology and cultural anthropology.

== Life ==
Ina-Maria Greverus grew up before and during the Second World War in Zwickau on the Saale. After the occupation of Saxony by the Soviet army, she fled to relatives in Alte Land. She completed her A-levels in Stade. During her studies in Marburg, she met Will Greverus, to whom she was married from 1952 to 1968. This marriage produced three children.

For professional reasons, she later lived in Giessen, Lahnau-Atzbach and Frankfurt am Main.

Ina-Maria Greverus undertook many research and private trips, which were characterized by her ethnological view. She described herself as a philobatin.

== Career ==
Ina-Maria Greverus initially studied German Studies, Scandinavian Studies, Art History and Folklore at the Marburg and University of Uppsala. In 1956, she was awarded a doctorate in philosophy at the University of Marburg with the dissertation Die Geschenke des kleinen Volkes - KHM 182 - Eine vergleichende Untersuchung. In 1970, she completed her habilitation at the University of Giessen with the work Der territoriale Mensch, an analysis of the phenomena of Heimat and identity. She worked as a professor in Giessen from 1971. In 1974 she founded the Institute for Cultural Anthropology and European Ethnology at the University of Frankfurt am Main and became its first professor and director until her retirement in 1997. Greverus' successor since 1998 has been her student Gisela Welz.

== Publications (selection) ==
- Scandinavian Ballads of the Middle Ages. 1963.
- The territorial man. A literary-anthropological attempt on the phenomenon of home. Frankfurt am Main 1972.
- as ed.: Denkmalräume - Lebensräume. 1976.
- Kultur und Alltagswelt. An introduction to questions of cultural anthropology. Munich 1978 (= Beck'sche schwarze Reihe. Vol. 182).
- with others: Tourismus. A critical picture book. 1978.
- In search of home. Munich 1979 (= Beck'sche schwarze Reihe. Volume 189).
- with Gottfried Kiesow and Reinhard Reuter: Das hessische Dorf. Study on village renewal. Frankfurt am Main 1982.
- Neues Zeitalter oder verkehrte Welt. Anthropology as Critique. Darmstadt 1990 (= WB-Forum. Vol. 52).
- Die Anderen und Ich. On recognizing oneself, being recognized and being recognized; cultural anthropological texts. Darmstadt 1995.
- Anthropologisch reisen. Münster [u. a.] 2002.

== Prizes and awards ==
- 1997: Goethe-Plakette des Landes Hessen

== Literature ==
- Rolf Wilhelm Brednich: Greverus, Ina-Maria. In: Encyclopedia of Fairy Tales Volume 6 (1990), pp. 142–143.
- Greverus, Ina-Maria. In: Walter Habel (ed.): Who is who? The German Who's Who. 24th edition. Schmidt-Römhild, Lübeck 1985, ISBN 3-7950-2005-0, p. 406.
- Ina-Maria Greverus, Erika Haindl (ed.): Attempts to escape civilization. About dropouts. C. H. Beck, Munich 1983, ISBN 3-406-09275-6.
