= Braunschweig Classix Festival =

Braunschweig Classix
- Genre: classical music festival
- Dates: May–June, September–November
- Locations: Braunschweig, South East Lower Saxony, Germany
- Years active: 1988–present

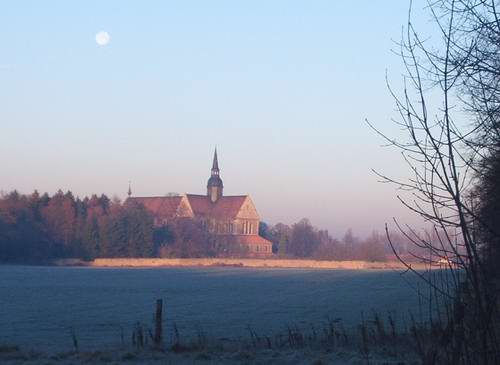
Klosterkirche Riddagshausen - site of former Braunschweig Classix concerts

The Braunschweig Classix Festival was an annual classical music festival held in South East Lower Saxony (North Germany), in an area around Braunschweig (Brunswick) located between Hannover (Hanover) and Magdeburg, Wolfsburg and Fürstenberg.

== History ==
The festival was founded in 1988 by German pianist Hans-Christian Wille as Braunschweiger Kammermusikpodium (KMP). It was renamed Braunschweig Classix Festival in 2001. Superintendent is Hans-Christian Wille. In 2011 the KMP GmbH became insolvent and was closed. Ownership of the festival name was transferred to the Volksbank eG Braunschweig Wolfsburg. By granting licences in 2011 and 2012 two concerts were held under the festival name in Clausthal-Zellerfeld at the Sympatec GmbH's location Pulverhaus, with ongoing concerts since 2013 under the spin-off Harz Classix Festivals.

== Concerts ==
The main concert season is from May to June and consists of more than 60 concerts and events and since 2004 concerts are presented throughout the year. In 2006 the 19th festival is from May 5 - June 4 / September 3 / October 4 / October 29 - November 25. Diverse Venues such as concert-halls, theaters, historic castles, manor houses, churches and barns are situated in cities such as Braunschweig, Magdeburg, Wolfsburg but also in smaller towns as well as in the countryside. The festival offers a wide range of musical genres. While maintaining its main focus on classical music some events of jazz and crossover are also included.

== Artists ==
Artists that have been presented by Braunschweig Classix include Cecilia Bartoli, Addys Mercedes (Cuba), Mstislav Rostropovich, Juilliard String Quartet, Arcadi Volodos, Lang Lang, Evgeny Kissin, Kenric Tam, Les Tambours Du Bronx, Munich Philharmonic Orchestra under James Levine, Leipzig Gewandhaus Orchestra under Herbert Blomstedt, Vienna Philharmonic Orchestra under Zubin Mehta, Philadelphia Orchestra under Christoph Eschenbach.
