= Goethe-Plakette des Landes Hessen =

German cultural award

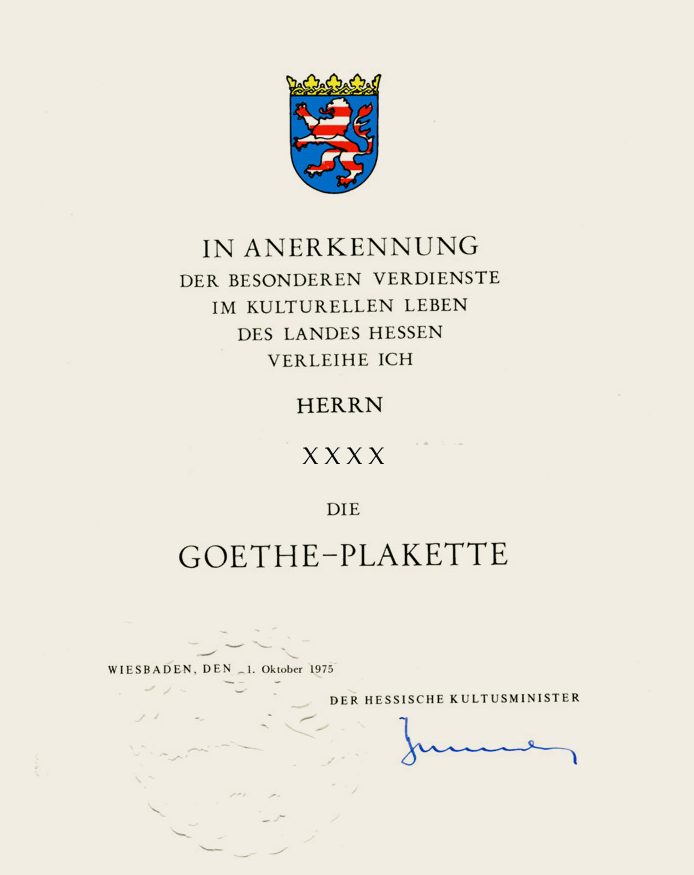
Certificate Goethe Plaque 1972

Goethe-Plakette (Goethe Plaque) is the highest award by the Hessian Ministry for Science and the Arts of the federal state of Hesse, Germany, named after Johann Wolfgang von Goethe. It has been awarded since 1949 at irregular intervals. The award is given to individuals who have contributed to arts and culture in a special way and have been influential in the cultural development of the state of Hesse.

== Recipients ==
- Hans Hoffmann (1949)
- Bruno Stürmer (1952)
- Wilhelm Martin Dienstbach (1953)
- Erwin Piscator (1953)
- Rudolf Bultmann (1954)
- Franz Schramm (1954)
- Rudolf Asbach (1954)
- Georg Muche (1955)
- Friedrich Noack (1955)
- Hans Brockhaus (1955)
- Bernhard von Brentano (1955)
- Kasimir Edschmid (1955)
- Otto Ritschl (1955)
- Fritz von Unruh (1955)
- Carl Schuricht (1955)
- Eberhard Beckmann (1956)
- Erich Hylla (1956)
- Hermann Kasack (1956)
- Hermann Heiß (1957)
- Hans Leistikow (1957)
- Hanns Wilhelm Eppelsheimer (1958)
- Hermann Pfeifer (1958)
- Boris Rajewsky (1958)
- Eduard Bornemann (1960)
- Werner Haftmann (1964)
- Gerhard F. Hering (1968)
- Max Horkheimer (1970)
- Karl Gerold (1971)
- Marie Luise Kaschnitz (1971)
- Karl Ernst Demandt (1973)
- Karl Krolow (1975)
- Philipp Mohler (1975)
- Ernst Krenek (1978)
- Kurt Hessenberg (1979)
- Christine Brückner (1982)
- Erich Herzog (1982)
- Siegfried Heinrich (1983)
- Hilmar Hoffmann (1985)
- Otto Kasten (1987)
- Fritz Ebner (1992)
- Hans-Dieter Resch (1992)
- Hans Drewanz (1994)
- Georg Hensel (1995)
- Gisela Brackert (1997)
- Tyron Montgomery (1997)
- Ina-Maria Greverus |(1997)
- Thomas Stellmach (1997)
- Willi Ziegler (1998)
- Wilhelm Nils Fresenius (2000)
- Ulrich Reuling (2000)
- Helen Bonzel (2001)
- Michael Herrmann (2002)
- Leo Karl Gerhartz (2003)
- Eva Demski (2004)
- Wolfram Nicol (2005)
- Emil Mangelsdorff (2006)
- Wolfgang Seeliger (2006)
- Hans Hollmann (2006)
- Solf Schaefer (2007)
- Margareta Dillinger (2007)
- Johnny Klinke (2007)
- Martin Lutz (2007)
- Heinz-Werner Wunderlich (2007)
- Hermann Zapf (2007)
- Eike Wilm Schulte (2008)
- Fritz-Rudolf Herrmann (2008)
- Michael Hocks (2008)
- Udo Henke (2010)
- Paulus Böhmer (2011)
- Claus Helmer (2012)
- Alexander U. Martens (2012)
- Max Hollein (2016)
- Frank Brabant (2018)
- Nguyen Thien Nhan (2018)
- Reimer von Essen (2019)
- Werner Kleinkauf (2019)
- Otto-Herman Frey (2020)
- Ursula Braasch-Schwersmann (2021)
- Ursula Jungherr (2022)
- Karl Max Einhäupl (2023)
- Maja Wolff (2024)
