= Hallgarten (Rheingau) =

Town quarter in Hesse, Germany

- Stadtteil of Oestrich-Winkel
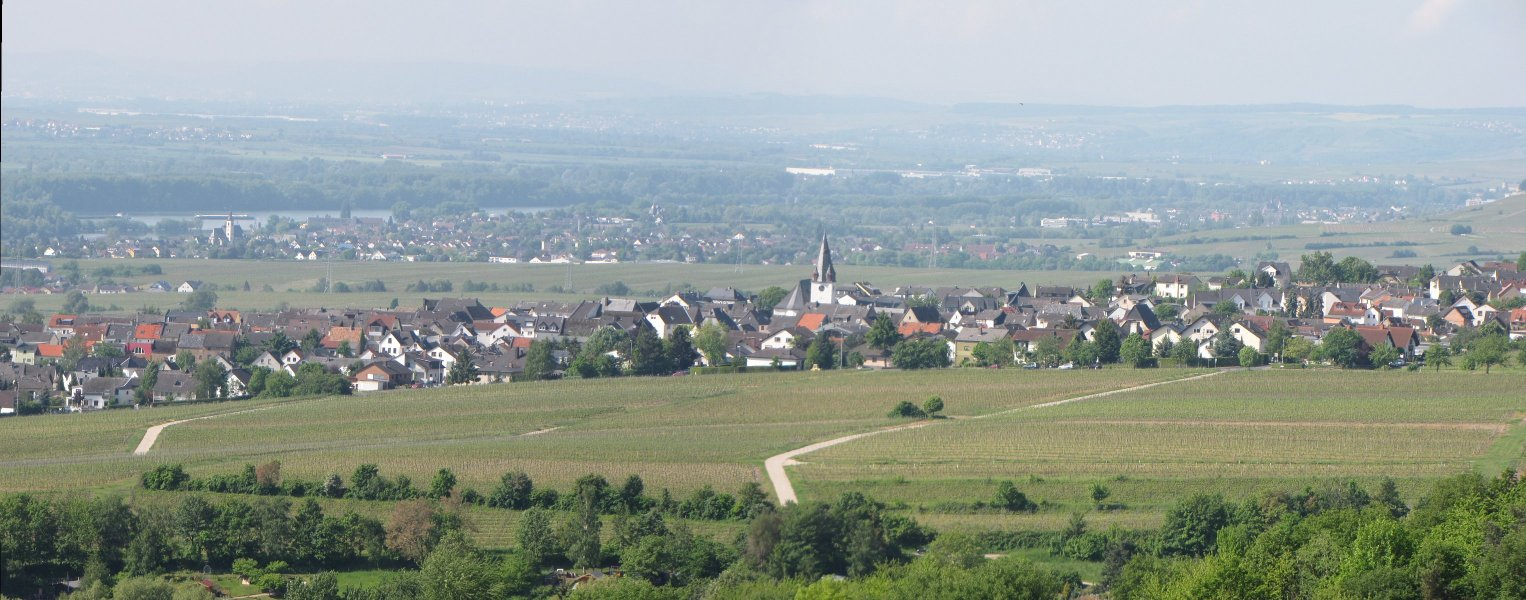
- Interactive map of Hallgarten
- Location within Germany Location within Hesse
- Coordinates: 50°1′38.38″N 8°1′52.43″E
- Country: Germany
- State: Hesse
- Admin. region: Darmstadt
- District: Rheingau-Taunus-Kreis
- Town: Oestrich-Winkel
- Elevation: 199 m (653 ft)

Population
  - Total: 2,300
- Time zone: UTC+01:00 (CET)
  - Summer (DST): UTC+02:00 (CEST)
- Postal codes: 65375
- Dialling codes: 06723
- Vehicle registration: RÜD

Hallgarten is a quarter of Oestrich-Winkel, Hesse, Germany. It lies within the Rheingau wine region.

Its church, dedicated to the Assumption of Mary, is a venue of the Rheingau Musik Festival.
