= Hessian Order of Merit =

Decoration of Merit
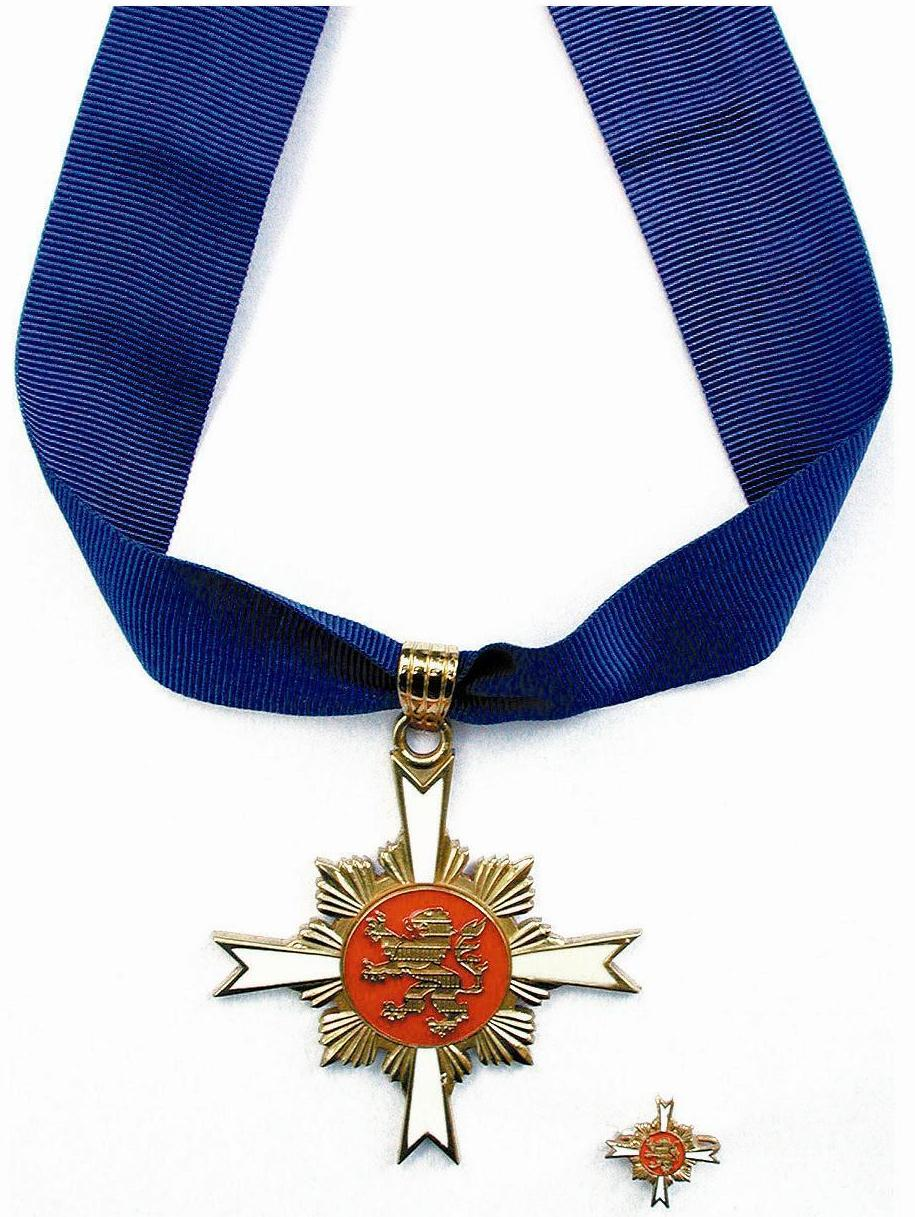

Awarded by the Minister-President of Hesse
- Type: Civil order of merit
- Established: 1 December 1989
- Country: Germany
- Awarded for: Outstanding contributions to the state of Hesse
- Grades: Member

Statistics
- Total inductees: 430
- Ribbon bar of the order

The Hessian Order of Merit (German: Hessischer Verdienstorden) is a civil order of merit, and the highest award of the German State of Hesse. The order was established 1 December 1989.

== Criteria ==
The order is presented by the Minister-President of Hesse based on nominations from citizens, though self-nominations are not permitted. The order honours men and women for outstanding contributions to Hesse and may be awarded without regard to residence or citizenship. The order is presented in two classes, the first class being worn around the neck, and the second class being worn suspended from a ribbon on the chest. The number of living recipients is limited to 2,000 for the second class and 800 for the first class.

== Appearance ==
The badge of the order is a gold rimmed white enamel cross. The center medallion is red with a gold rim. Upon the medallion is a lion as depicted on the Coat of arms of Hesse. Between the arms of the cross are the gold rays of an eight pointed star. The cross is worn on a blue ribbon around his neck in the first class and on a suspended from a ribbon worn on the chest for the second class. Women wear the cross of the Order on a bow of ribbon below the left shoulder.

== Notable recipients ==
- Christine Brückner
- Michael Herrmann
- Ben Hodges
- Luc Jochimsen
- Steffi Jones
- Odo Marquard
- Werner Meißner
