= Tzimon Barto =

American classical pianist

Tzimon Barto (born Johnny Barto Smith; January 2, 1963, in Eustis, Florida) is an American classical pianist. He is also a bodybuilder, novelist, poet, philosopher and speaks seven languages. He is best known for his work with Christoph Eschenbach, who discovered Barto in 1988.

== Discography ==
- J. S. Bach: The Well-Tempered Clavier, Book I, NAÏVE
- Ives: Piano Sonata Nr. 2, CAPRICCIO
- Jean-Philippe Rameau, A Basket of Wild Strawberries, A Selection of Keyboard Jewels, ONDINE
- Piano Concertos by Pfitzner, Rachmaninov, Prokofiev, Bartók, Gershwin, Liszt, Carnaval des animaux/Saint-Saëns, Nights in Spanish Gardens/de Falla, Brahms, Des canyons aux étoiles/Messiaen, Tchaikovski, Chopin
- Solo records with pieces by Chopin, Liszt, Schumann, Ravel, Schubert, Haydn
