= Rolf Beck =

German conductor (born 1945)

- Born: 15 January 1945 (age 81); Michelstadt, Germany
- Education: Marburg University; Lausanne University; Musikhochschule Frankfurt
- Occupations: Conductor; Culture and music administrator
- Organizations: Schleswig-Holstein Musik Festival; Internationale Chorakademie Lübeck
- Awards: Order of Merit of Germany; Honorary professor of Schleswig-Holstein

Rolf Beck (15 January 1945) is a German conductor, especially a choral conductor. He was, from 1999 to 2013, Intendant of the Schleswig-Holstein Musik Festival. He founded several choirs and the Internationale Chorakademie Lübeck (International Choral Academy Lübeck).

== Career ==
Born in Michelstadt, Beck studied law at the Marburg University and Lausanne University. He studied conducting at the Musikhochschule Frankfurt with Helmuth Rilling. He founded and directed the Marburger Vocalensemble (Marburg Vocal Ensemble).

From 1981, Beck was intendant of the Bamberg Symphony, where he founded the choir Chor der Bamberger Symphoniker in 1983, and the instrumental ensemble Concerto Bamberg. From 1996 he was director of the sections orchestra and choir for the broadcaster Norddeutscher Rundfunk. He was intendant of the Schleswig-Holstein Musik Festival from 1999 to 2013. In 2013 he conducted with the festival choir and orchestra a charity concert of the President of Germany, Joachim Gauck, featuring Verdi's Quattro pezzi sacri and Rossini's Stabat Mater. He founded a Chorakademie as part of the festival, a place of study and performance for young international singers. After retiring, he kept directing the academy under the new name Internationale Chorakademie Lübeck (International Choral Academy Lübeck). He founded in 2015 a choral academy in Brazil, performing first Carl Orff's Carmina Burana. With the Lübeck academy, he conducted four of Bach's motets for the Rheingau Musik Festival at St. Stephan, Mainz on 27 August 2015.

He was awarded the Bundesverdienstkreuz in 1989, and was appointed honorary professor of Schleswig-Holstein in 2008.
