= Eberbach Abbey =

Former Cistercian monk cloister in the Rheingau

- Kloster Eberbach
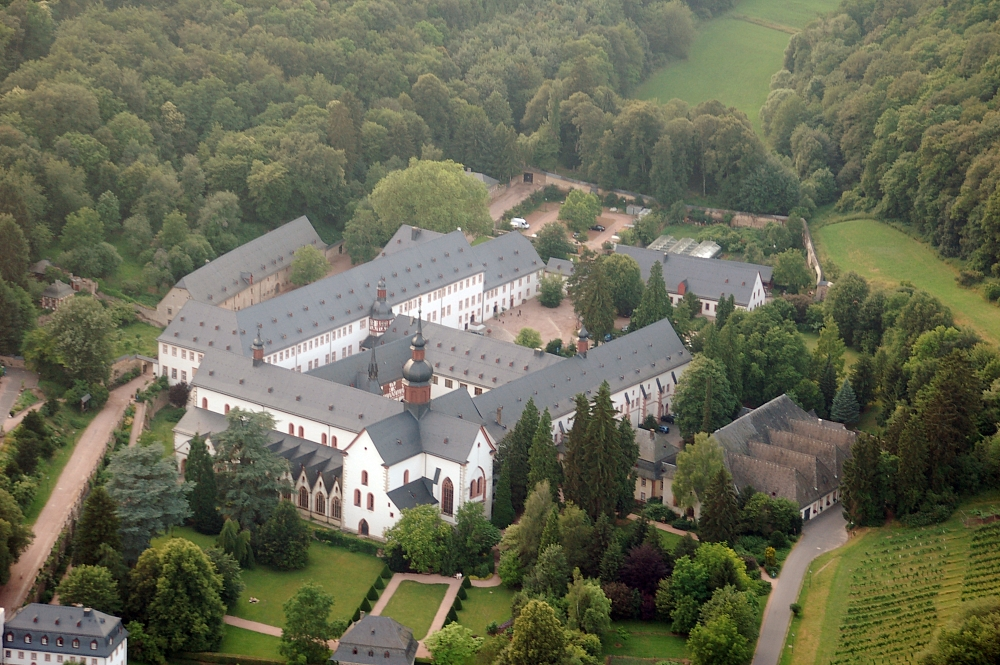
- Eberbach Abbey, 2006

- Location within Hesse Location within Germany
- Interactive map of Eberbach Abbey

Monastery information
- Order: Cistercian
- Established: 1136
- Disestablished: 1803

Architecture
- Style: Romanesque and early Gothic

Site
- Location: Eltville, Hesse, Germany
- Coordinates: 50°02′33″N 8°02′48″E
- Public access: yes

Eberbach Abbey (German: Kloster Eberbach) is a former Cistercian monastery in Eltville in the Rheingau, Germany. On account of its Romanesque and early Gothic buildings it is considered one of the most significant architectural heritage sites in Hesse.

In the winter of 1985/86 some of the interior scenes of the film The Name of the Rose were shot here. The abbey is a main venue of the annual Rheingau Musik Festival.

== History ==
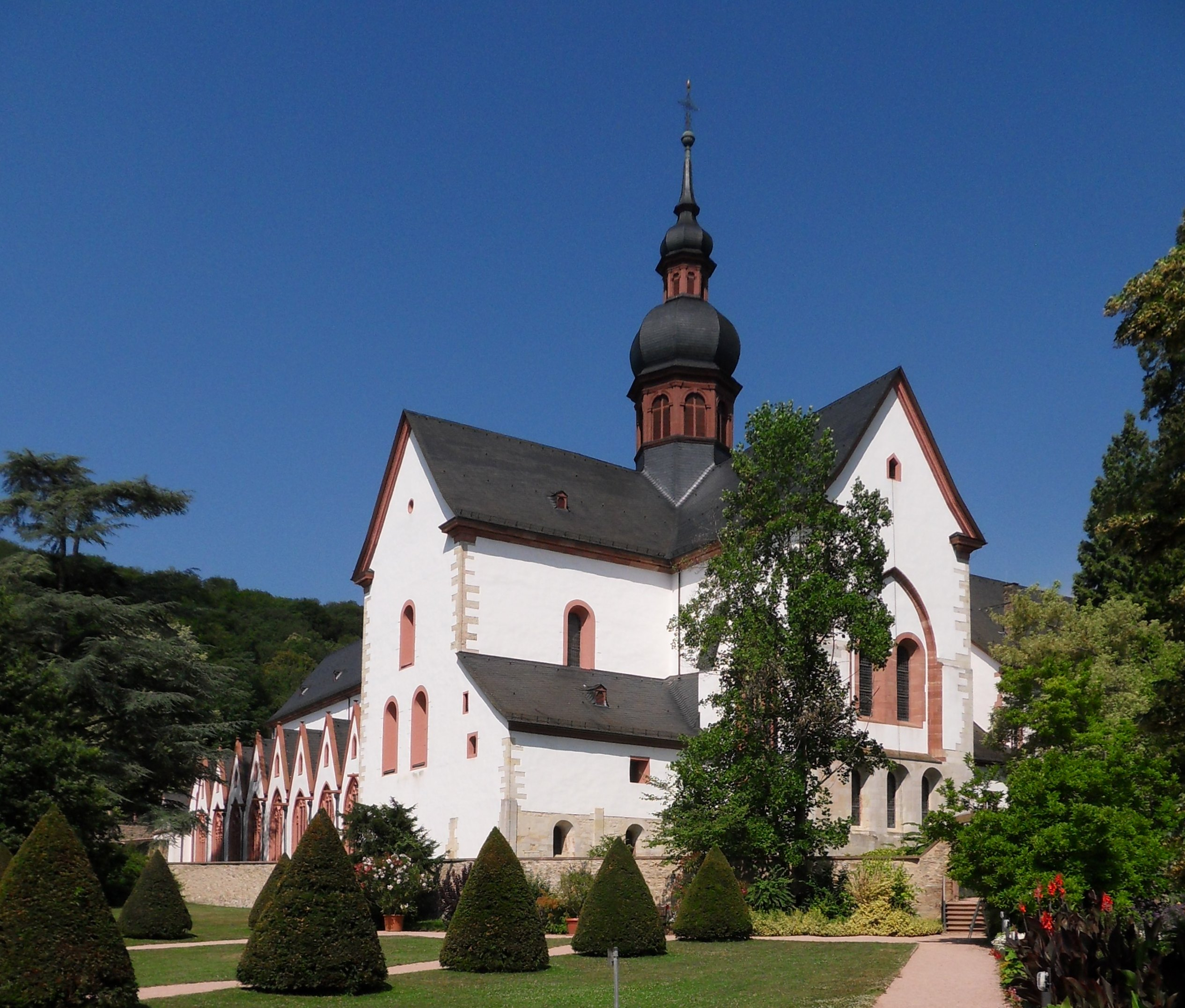
Abbey church

=== Abbey ===
The first monastic house at the site was founded in 1116 by Archbishop Adalbert of Mainz, as a house of Augustinian canons. It was then bestowed by him in 1131 upon the Benedictines. This foundation failed to establish itself, and the successor, Kloster Eberbach, was founded in 1136 by Bernard of Clairvaux as the first Cistercian monastery on the east bank of the Rhine.

Eberbach soon became one of the largest and most active monasteries of Germany. From it a number of other foundations were made: Schönau Abbey near Heidelberg in 1142; Otterberg Abbey in the Palatinate in 1144; Gottesthal Abbey near Liège in 1155; and Arnsburg Abbey in the Wetterau in 1174. At its height in the 12th and 13th centuries, the population is estimated to have been about 100 monks and over 200 lay brothers.

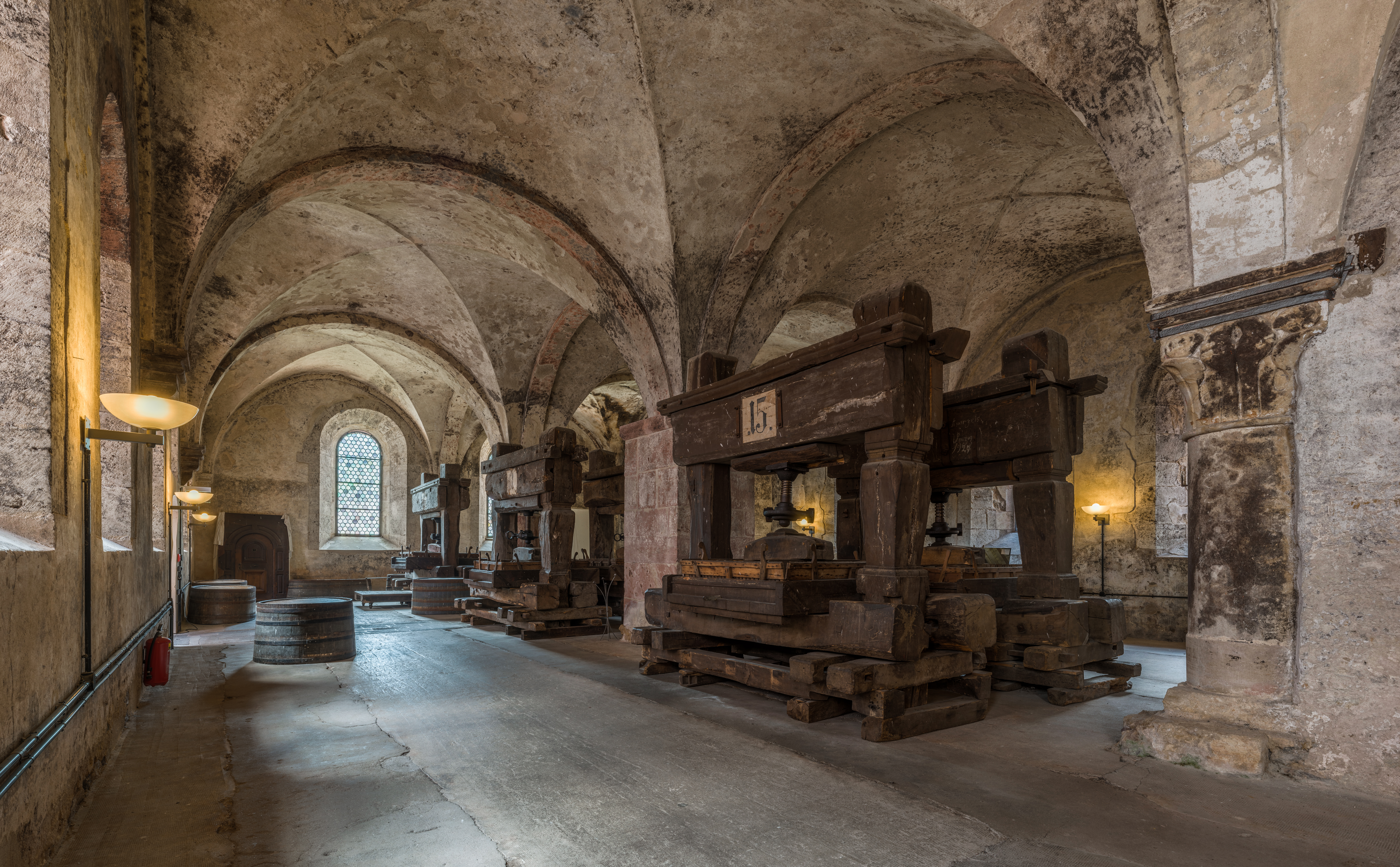
The lay brothers' refectory, home to 12 historic wine presses

Eberbach Abbey was also very successful economically, principally as a result of profits from the cultivation of vineyards and the production of wine. At least 14 members of the family of the Counts of Katzenelnbogen were buried in the church. Among them was Count Johann IV of Katzenelnbogen, who was the first to plant Riesling vines, in a new vineyard in the nearby village of Rüsselsheim, when the monks of Eberbach were still growing red grapes such as Grobrot, the earliest grape variety recorded in Eberbach.

In about 1525 it is said that in the abbey there was an enormous wine barrel with a volume of between c. 50,000 and 100,000 litres, which in the German Peasants' War of 1525 was heavily used by rebels from the Rheingau, who were encamped just below the monastery.

During the Thirty Years' War, the abbey was severely damaged, beginning with an attack by the Swedish army in 1631. Many valuable items from the church and the library were looted, and the monks were forced to flee. Only 20 of them returned in 1635 to begin a laborious reconstruction.

The 18th century was a period of great economic success: surviving accounts show that the abbey profits were regularly invested on the Frankfurt money market.

The final decline set in with the French Revolution. After the Reichsdeputationshauptschluss the abbey was dissolved on 18 September 1803 and with its assets and territory became the property of Prince Friedrich Augustus of Nassau-Usingen.

=== After secularisation ===
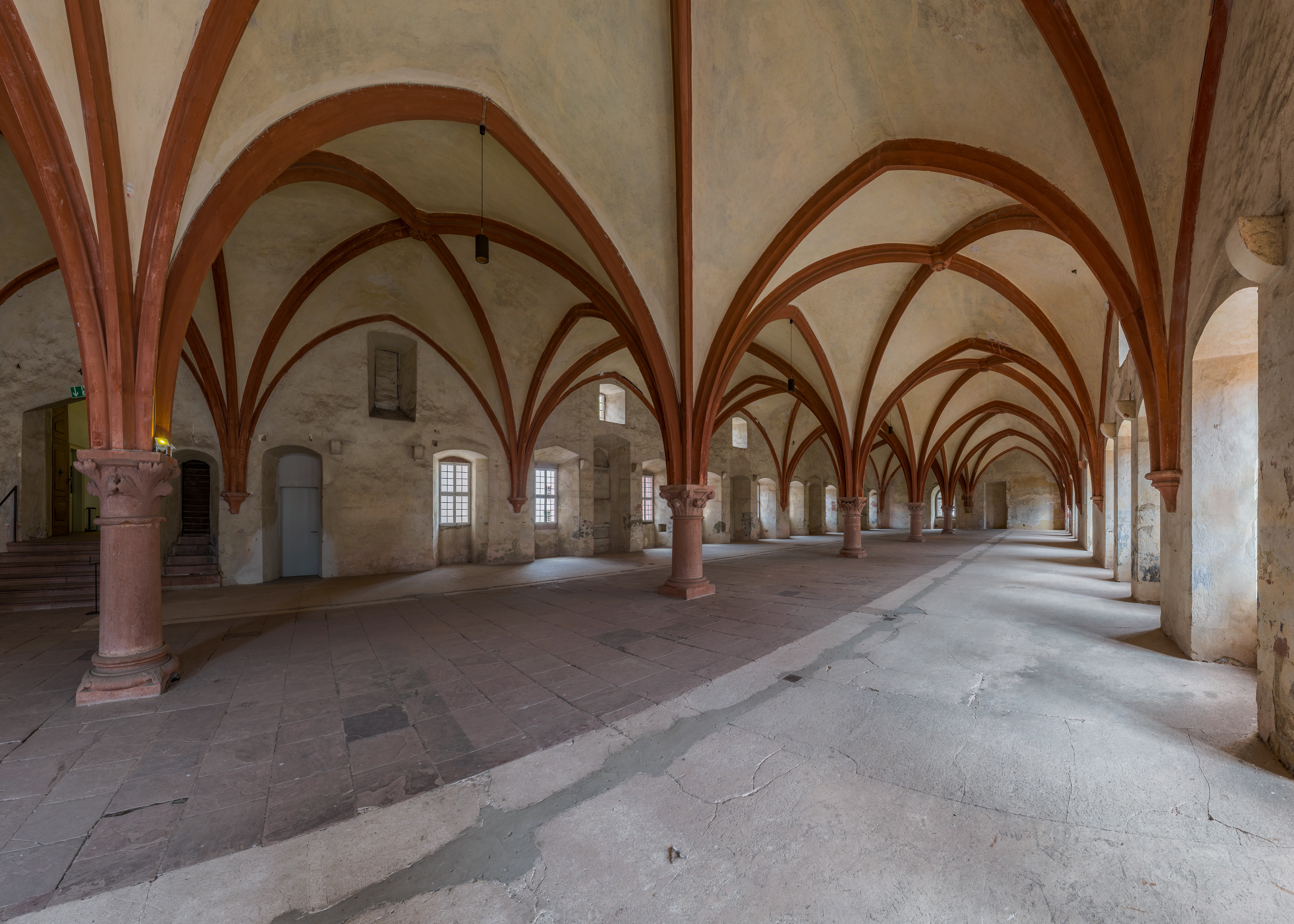
Dormitory

The lands passed from Nassau-Usingen in 1866 to Prussia, from 1918 to 1945 to the People's State of Hesse, and from 1945 have formed part of the State of Hesse. The premises were put to a variety of uses. An asylum was accommodated here until 1873 (the forerunner of the Zentrum für Soziale Psychiatrie Rheinblick) and until 1912 a prison. Management of the vineyards and wine production has continued in state hands. After considerable structural work Eberbach serves inter alia as a venue for cultural events and displays, and as a film location, as for example for Umberto Eco's The Name of the Rose (1985).

== Eberbach Abbey Foundation ==
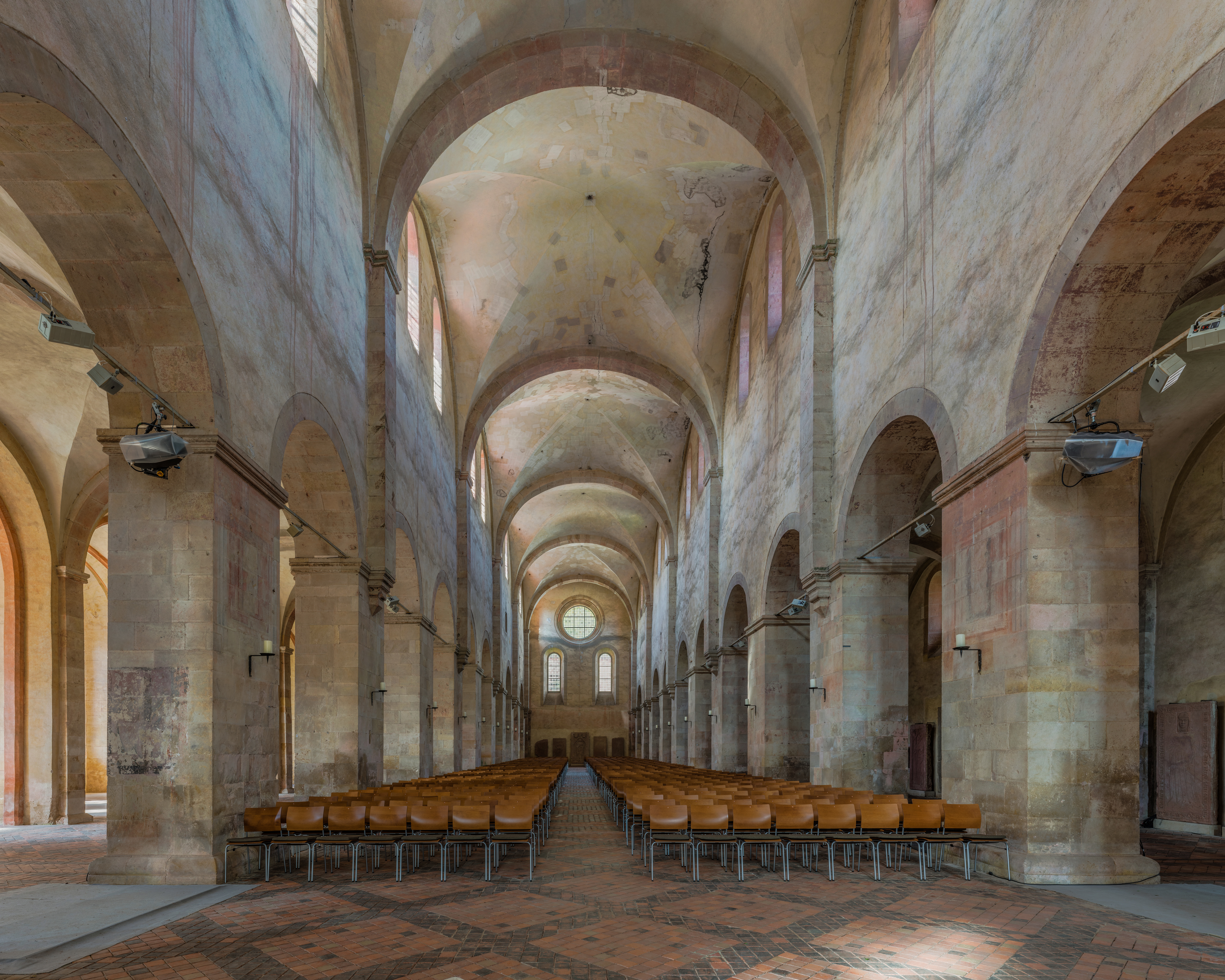
Abbey church

With effect from 1 January 1998 the State of Hesse transferred the entire abbey complex into the ownership of a publicly-owned charitable foundation, the Stiftung Kloster Eberbach ("Eberbach Abbey Foundation"). This has the goal of conserving the architectural and cultural monument by overseeing its appropriate, controlled and sustainable use as well as of maintaining the historical tradition of wine production. All wine production activities are bundled since 2003 by Hessische Staatsweingüter Kloster Eberbach.

== Description ==
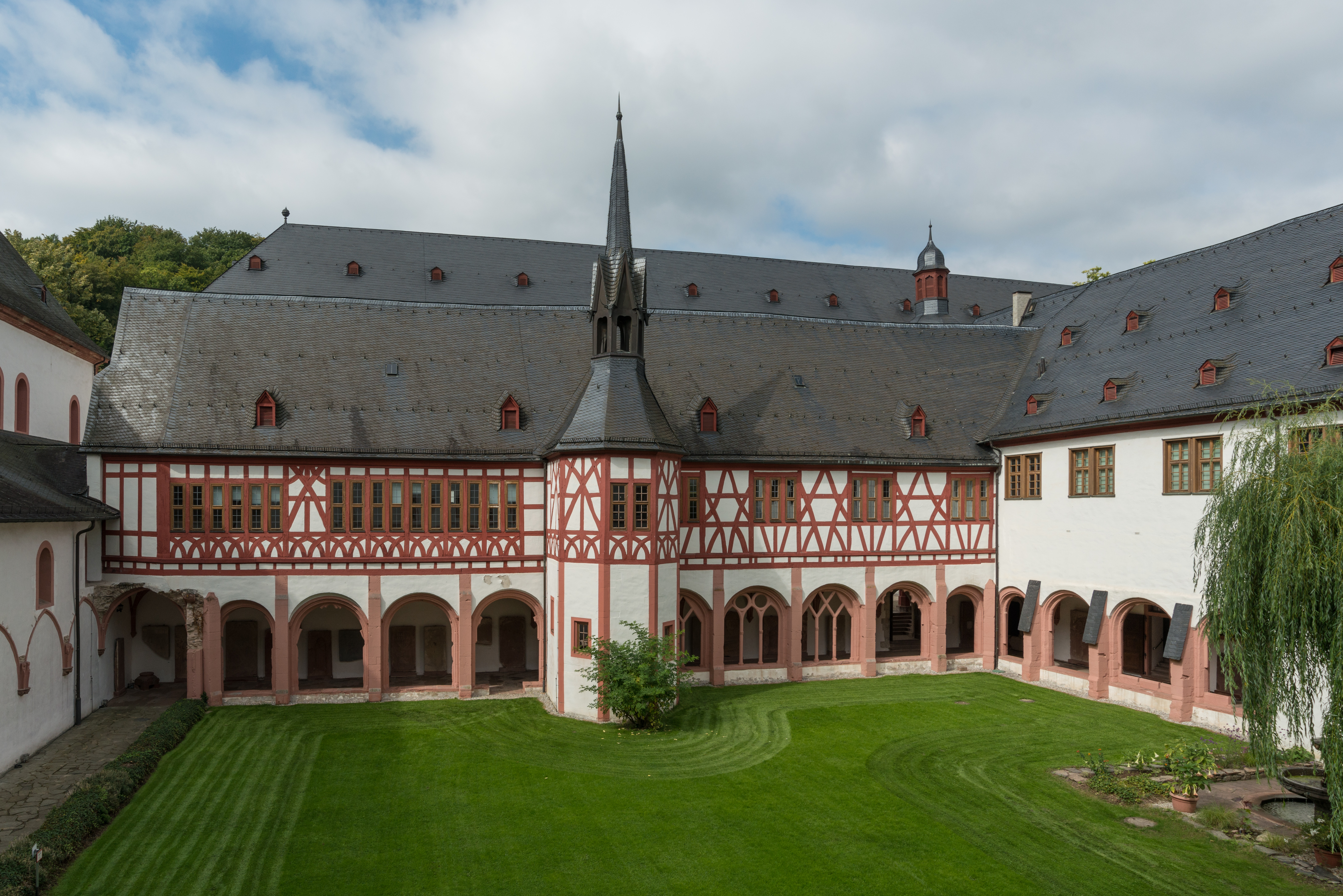
Cloisters

The buildings date from the Romanesque, Gothic and Baroque periods. A property list, the Oculus Memoriae, survives from as early as the year 1211, giving detailed information on the possessions and premises of the abbey complex. It was edited and published 1981–1987.

The buildings include:

- The abbey church, a three-aisled Romanesque basilica with transept, containing the tombs of some of the Archbishops of Mainz
- The cloisters, the south side of which is Gothic, the north side partly Gothic and partly Romanesque, and the remainder a 19th-century restoration
- The chapter room, a late Gothic square room with a central pillar, restored with ceiling and wall paintings
- The Fraternei, an early Gothic room with heavy vaulting, used since the Middle Ages as a wine cellar. It is also known as the Cabinetkeller, which is the origin of the use of the term Kabinett as a quality description of German wine.
- The Dormitorium (dormitory), an early Gothic room about 70 metres long containing vaulting and short columns with sculptured capitals, and one of the few such rooms of this size and quality remaining in Europe
- The north wing, refurbished in the 18th century and containing the refectory, with a Baroque stucco ceiling by Daniel Schenk. It replaced the earlier Gothic refectory to the north
- The west wing, accommodating the library, where the abbey museum was set up in 1995. This contains inter alia the oldest surviving Cistercian glass window in Germany (of about 1180), the original capitals from the cloisters, now replaced by modern replicas, various sculptures, portraits of Bernard of Clairvaux and Baroque furnishings
- In a separate building to the west of the monastic quarters, the "conversI building" or "lay-brothers' building", containing the lay-brothers' refectory (45 metres long) and the Laiendormitorium (lay-brothers' dormitory) (at over 80 metres long, the largest surviving Romanesque secular room in Europe), and attached to it a Romanesque wine-cellar and various small domestic buildings from the 17th century
- Outside of the inner monastic precinct to the east, the hospital, service buildings and 18th and 19th century wine cellars

== Wine production ==
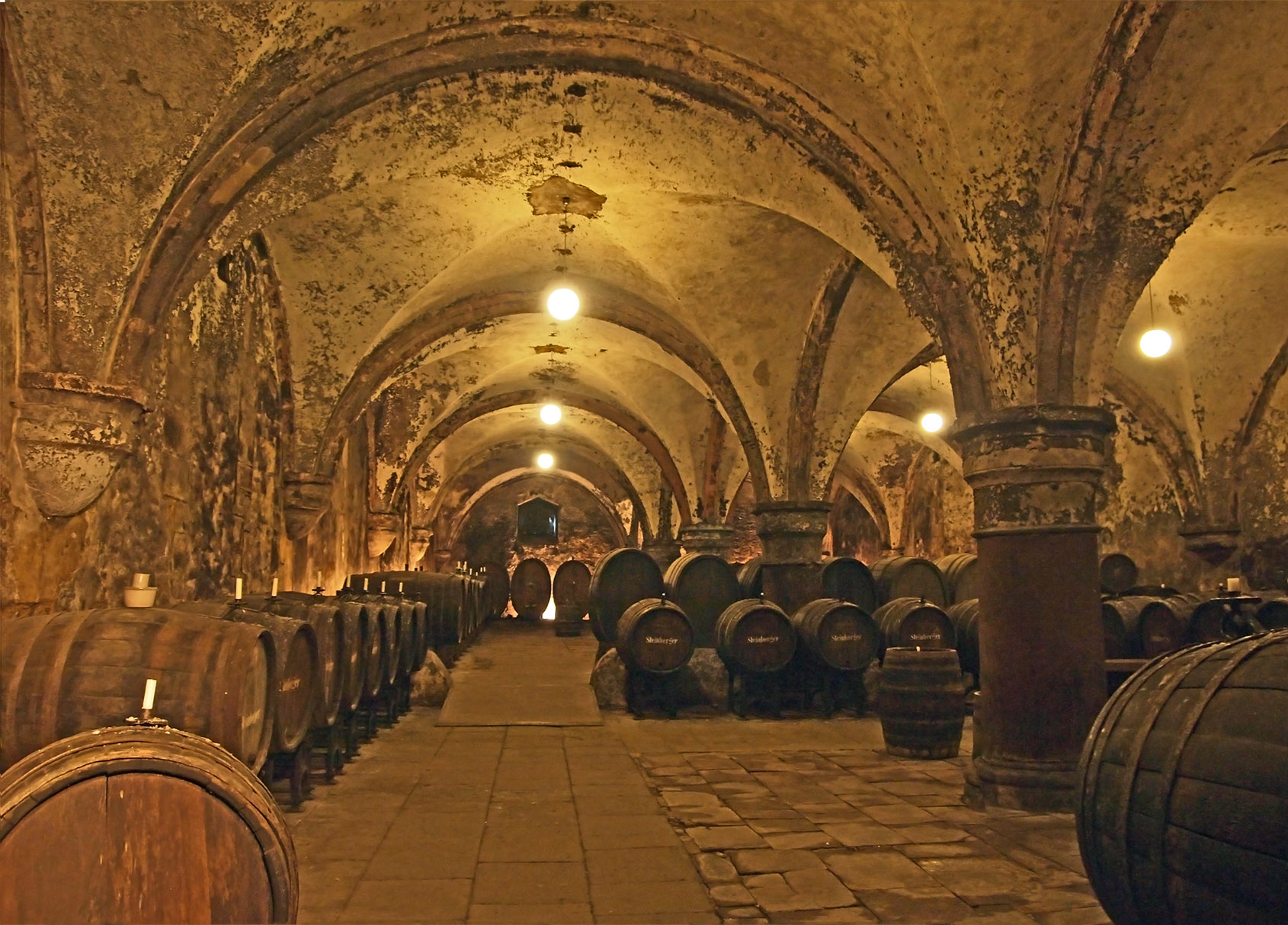
Historic wine cellar

The vineyards of Eberbach Abbey were, at 300 hectares, the largest in medieval Europe. Most of them are now the property of the state of Hesse and are run by the Hessische Staatsweingüter GmbH Kloster Eberbach, which manages the largest connected area of wine production in Germany, comprising vineyards on the slopes of the Rhine Valley and on the Hessische Bergstrasse. Of the 238 hectares which are under cultivation, three-quarters are planted with Riesling, but Chardonnay, Pinot blanc, Pinot gris, Pinot noir and Dornfelder are also grown. Hessische Staatsweingüter Kloster Eberbach is a member of the Verband Deutscher Prädikatsweingüter (VDP).

The state of Hesse owns a total of 184.5168 hectares, which are distributed across the following locations:

- Assmannshausen .......... 19.1741 ha,
- Erbach ............. .......... 6.4213 ha,
- Eltville ............ .......... 9.4028 ha,
- Rauenthal ................... 32.9809 ha,
- Hochheim ................... 16.4864 ha,
- Hattenheim ................. 44.1911 ha,
- Rüdesheim .................. 22.0243 ha,
- Heppenheim ................ 19.2031 ha,
- Bensheim .................... 5.2153 ha,
- Schönberg (Bensheim)..... 9.4175 ha

The state government planned in 2017 to transfer the vineyards owned by the state, which are currently leased to Hessische Staatsweingüter GmbH Kloster Eberbach, to a newly founded company, the Kloster Eberbach Foundation, or directly to Hessische Staatsweingüter. In a letter dated 27 July 2017, the European Commission stated that, "after examining the information provided by your authorities, it has concluded that the above-mentioned measure does not constitute State aid within the meaning of Article 107(1) of the Treaty on the Functioning of the European Union".

== Burials ==
The church contains numerous interesting monuments and tombs, notable among them being those of:

- Gerlach von Nassau, Archbishop of Mainz (died 1371)
- Adolph II of Nassau (died 1475).

== Today ==
The abbey has been the principal venue for the concerts of the Rheingau Musik Festival since 1988, with concerts in the Basilika (church), the Dormitorium, the Laiendormitorium and the Kreuzgang (cloisters). It has also been used for other concerts.

The public areas can be viewed daily, either with or without guided tours. Rooms can be booked for conferences and events. Wine tastings for groups can also be booked, and twice a year there are wine auctions.

On the night of 26 April 2005 the abbey suffered severe damage from flooding. This was due to heavy rain, which caused the Kisselbach river to overflow its banks, and the increased volume of water brought about the collapse of the 18th century storm drain under the abbey.

== Restoration ==
Major restoration of the complex began in 1986, financed by the State of Hesse. Restoration of the interior of the basilica began in March 2018. The project was estimated to cost 130 Million Euros, and was planned to be completed in 2024.

During restoration, new archeological finds have been made, which will need to be preserved and documented. For example, parts of the Gothic floor and graves were found in the southern nave of the basilica.

== Literature ==
- Wolfgang Einsingbach, Wolfgang Riedel: Kloster Eberbach, DKV-Kunstführer No. 267, 17. Auflage, Deutscher Kunstverlag München Berlin 2007. ISBN 978-3-422-02105-1 (also available in English and French).
