= Christoph Eschenbach =

German pianist and conductor

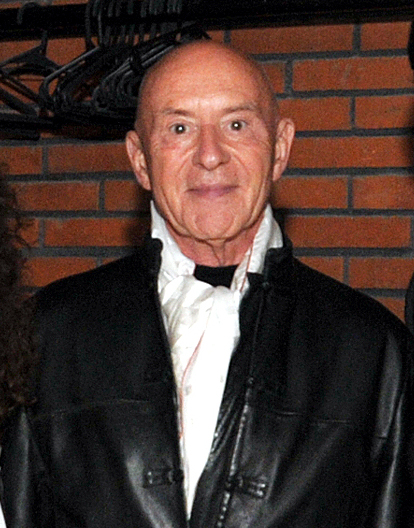
- Christoph Eschenbach in 2012
- Born: Christoph Ringmann; 20 February 1940 (age 86); Breslau, Lower Silesia, Prussia, Germany
- Occupations: Classical pianist; Conductor
- Organizations: Houston Symphony; Philadelphia Orchestra; National Symphony Orchestra; Konzerthausorchester Berlin
- Parent(s): Heribert Ringmann, Margarethe Jaross
- Awards: Order of Merit of the Federal Republic of Germany; Ordre des Arts et des Lettres; Ernst von Siemens Music Prize; Grammy Award

Music Director of the National Symphony Orchestra
- In office 2010–2017
- Website: christopheschenbach.com

Christoph Eschenbach (German: [ˈkʁɪstɔf ˈɛʃn̩bax]; born 20 February 1940) is a German pianist and conductor. Over the past decades, he has held positions as music directors at 13 orchestras worldwide. In 2014, he was awarded a Grammy Award for an album with works by Paul Hindemith and received the prestigious Ernst von Siemens Music Prize in 2015 for his contributions to music.

In 2025, his biography Christoph Eschenbach: Lebensatem Musik, written by cultural journalist Margarete Zander was published in German.

== Early life and education ==
Eschenbach was born on 20 February 1940 in Breslau, Germany (now Wrocław, Poland) as Christoph Ringmann. His parents were Margarethe (née Jaross), a singer and teacher of piano, and Heribert Ringmann, a conductor and musicologist in Breslau and Posen. He was orphaned during World War II: his mother died giving birth to him, and his father continued to conduct until late 1943, after leading a performance of Brahms’s Requiem in Breslau. He became an anti‑Nazi activist, was conscripted into a punishment battalion and killed on the Eastern Front.

His grandmother then cared for him, but she died in the winter of 1945–46 at a refugee camp in Mecklenburg. As a result of this trauma, Eschenbach did not speak for a year, until his adoptive mother asked if he wanted to play music. In 1946, his mother's cousin, Wallydore Eschenbach (née Jaross), adopted him and began teaching him piano from 1948 through 1959. He lived with Wallydore and her husband, Wolfram Eschenbach, first in Wismar and later in Neustadt in Holstein. At age 11, he attended a concert conducted by Wilhelm Furtwängler, which made a profound impression on him. In 1955, Eschenbach enrolled at the Musikhochschule in Cologne, studying piano with Hans‑Otto Schmidt‑Neuhaus and conducting with Wilhelm Brückner‑Rüggeberg. He also completed his Abitur at the Einhard‑Gymnasium in Aachen in 1959, then continued his studies at the Hochschule für Musik und Theater Hamburg with Eliza Hansen (piano) and again with Wilhelm Brückner‑Rüggeberg (conducting).

== Career ==
=== Early career and recognition ===
In 1964, Eschenbach made his first recording (of Mozart) for Deutsche Grammophon and signed a contract with the label after winning the ARD Piano Competition in 1962. A year later, he won the Clara Haskil Competition in Vevey, Switzerland. During this period, he continued his conducting studies with George Szell, working alongside him for more than three years, and also counted Herbert von Karajan among his mentors, making his pianist debut with the Berlin Philharmonic in 1972. As a pianist, he is particularly known for his Schubert and Mozart recordings, often in duo performances with Justus Frantz, and has also teamed with Dietrich Fischer‑Dieskau, Sviatoslav Richter, Lang Lang, Renée Fleming, Leonidas Kavakos, Peter Schreier, former German chancellor Helmut Schmidt, Matthias Goerne and Tzimon Barto to perform recitals internationally.

=== Conducting and music directorships ===
Eschenbach made his debut with the Chicago Symphony Orchestra in 1973. In 1978, he took over the artistic direction of the Staatsphilharmonie Rheinland‑Pfalz, and in 1981, he became principal guest conductor of the Tonhalle‑Orchester Zürich, subsequently serving as its chief conductor from 1982 to 1986. In 1982, he made his debut with the New York Philharmonic. From 1988 to 1999, he was music director of the Houston Symphony Orchestra, where he remains conductor laureate. During his tenure, the orchestra toured Japan and Europe and made several recordings for Koch International Classics and RCA. In his honor, the City of Houston placed a bronze commemorative star bearing his name in front of Jones Hall. During this period, he also served as co‑artistic director of the Pacific Music Festival in Japan from 1992 to 1998 and as music director of the Ravinia Festival from 1994 to 2003. Eschenbach made his debut with the Vienna Philharmonic in 2002.

He then led the NDR Symphony Orchestra Hamburg as chief conductor from 1998 to 2004. In 1998, he also made his debut as conductor with the Berlin Philharmonic, an orchestra he subsequently led on numerous occasions. Simultaneously, he was artistic director of the Schleswig‑Holstein Musik Festival from 1999 until 2003 and became principal conductor of the Schleswig‑Holstein Festival Orchestra in 2003.

In 2003, Eschenbach became the seventh music director of the Philadelphia Orchestra. His appointment came under discussion due to his limited engagements with the orchestra and initial concerns about rapport with musicians which the Philadelphia Orchestra Association characterized as inaccurate. Later, his preference for flexible tempi also received mixed responses. During Eschenbach's tenure, the orchestra secured a recording contract, appointed nine musicians (including four principals), and increased fundraising. After his initial three‑year contract was extended to 2008, Eschenbach and the orchestra announced in October 2006 that his tenure would conclude at the end of the 2007–2008 season. Following his directorship, Eschenbach returned as guest conductor for the 2008–2009 and 2009–2010 seasons.

Between 2000 and 2010, Eschenbach also held the position of music director of the Orchestre de Paris, after which he became music director at the National Symphony Orchestra in Washington until 2017.

In September 2008, the National Symphony Orchestra (NSO) appointed Eschenbach as its sixth music director, effective with the 2010–2011 season; he also became the inaugural music director of the Kennedy Center. In September 2011, the NSO and the Kennedy Center announced an extension of his contract through the 2014–2015 season. In March 2014, they further extended his tenure through the 2016–2017 season. A key initiative during his tenure was the "Maximum India" festival, which featured Western symphonic works inspired by Indian culture, including the premiere of a concerto by Zakir Hussain and performances of Olivier Messiaen's Turangalîla‑Symphonie and Alexander Zemlinsky’s Lyric Symphony.

In February 2015, the NSO announced that Eschenbach would conclude his tenure at the end of the 2016–2017 season, after which he assumed the title of conductor laureate of the NSO.

In 2016, the Bamberg Symphony Orchestra named him Honorary Conductor, an association that goes back to 1965, when he first appeared with this orchestra as a pianist. In November 2017, the Konzerthausorchester Berlin announced the appointment of Eschenbach as its next chief conductor, effective with the 2019–2020 season, with an initial contract of three years. From 2019 to 2022, he was honorary conductor of the Gothenburg Symphony Orchestra. In July 2021, the Konzerthausorchester Berlin announced the extension of Eschenbach's contract through the 2022–2023 season. He stood down from the Konzerthausorchester Berlin post at the close of the 2022–2023 season.

In January 2022, the Copenhagen Philharmonic announced the appointment of Eschenbach as its æres‑gæstedirigent (Honorary Guest Conductor), for a period of two seasons, following his debut.

In 2024, the NFM Wroclaw Philharmonic appointed him as music director, marking it a symbolic return to the city of his birth. He returns regularly to the Philadelphia Orchestra with the last time being in 2024.

=== Recordings ===
Eschenbach has made more than eighty recordings as pianist, conductor, or both; appeared in several television documentaries; and participated in numerous concert broadcasts for European, Japanese, and U.S. networks. He is widely credited with nurturing young talent, including soprano Renée Fleming; pianists Lang Lang and Tzimon Barto; violinists Ray Chen and Julia Fischer, cellists Claudio Bohórquez and Daniel Müller‑Schott; and soprano Marisol Montalvo.

== Awards and recognition ==
- 1962: ARD Munich Prizewinner (Germany)
- 1965: Clara Haskil Competition 1ª Prize (Switzerland)
- 1990: Federal Cross of Merit 1st Class
- 1991: Honorary Doctoral Degree from the University of Houston (USA)
- 1993: Pacific Music Festival, Leonard Bernstein Award
- 1997: Doctor of Fine Arts from Northwestern University (Chicago, USA)
- 2000: Silesia Cultural Prize from the state of Lower Saxony (Germany)
- 2001: Honorary Member of the Royal Academy of Music (London, UK)
- 2002: Knight Commander's Cross of the Order of Merit of the Federal Republic of Germany
- 2002: Legion d'honneur of France
- 2006: Chevalier (knight) of the Ordre des Arts et des Lettres
- 2010: Order of Merit of Schleswig-Holstein
- 2014: Grammy for his CD recording with Midori and the NDR Orchestra
- 2014: Rheingau Musik Preis
- 2015: Ernst von Siemens Music Prize
- 2015: Key of Suntory Hall for his concerts with the Vienna Philharmonic Orchestra (Japan)
- 2016: Paul Hindemith Prize from the City of Hanau (Germany)
- 2016: Brahms Prize from the Brahms Society (Germany)
- 2019: Honorary Professor of the State of Schleswig‑Holstein (Germany)
- 2023: Key to the City of Wrocław (Poland)
- 2023: Honorary Prize for his initiative of the yearly concert cycle in support of the Together for Children Union (Greece)
- 2024: Honorary doctorate from the University of Music and Performing Arts in Frankfurt am Main (Germany)
- 2024: Europa‑Preis SPD

Cultural offices
Preceded by Herbert Blomstedt	Principal Conductor, North German Radio Symphony Orchestra; 1998–2004	Succeeded by Christoph von Dohnányi
Preceded by Iván Fischer	Principal Conductor, Konzerthausorchester Berlin; 2019–2023	Succeeded by Joana Mallwitz
Preceded by Giancarlo Guerrero	Music Director, NFM Wrocław Philharmonic; 2024–present	Succeeded by incumbent
