= Emil Veesenmeyer =

German theologian and dean

Emil Veesenmeyer (1857–1944) was a German theologian, minister of the Bergkirche in Wiesbaden, the capital of Hesse, and later a dean.

He developed in 1891, together with the architect Johannes Otzen, the Wiesbadener Programm for Protestant church architecture. He was involved in building the Wiesbaden churches Ringkirche and Lutherkirche which followed the program.
