= Lutherkirche, Wiesbaden =

Protestant church is Wiesbaden, Germany

Lutherkirche
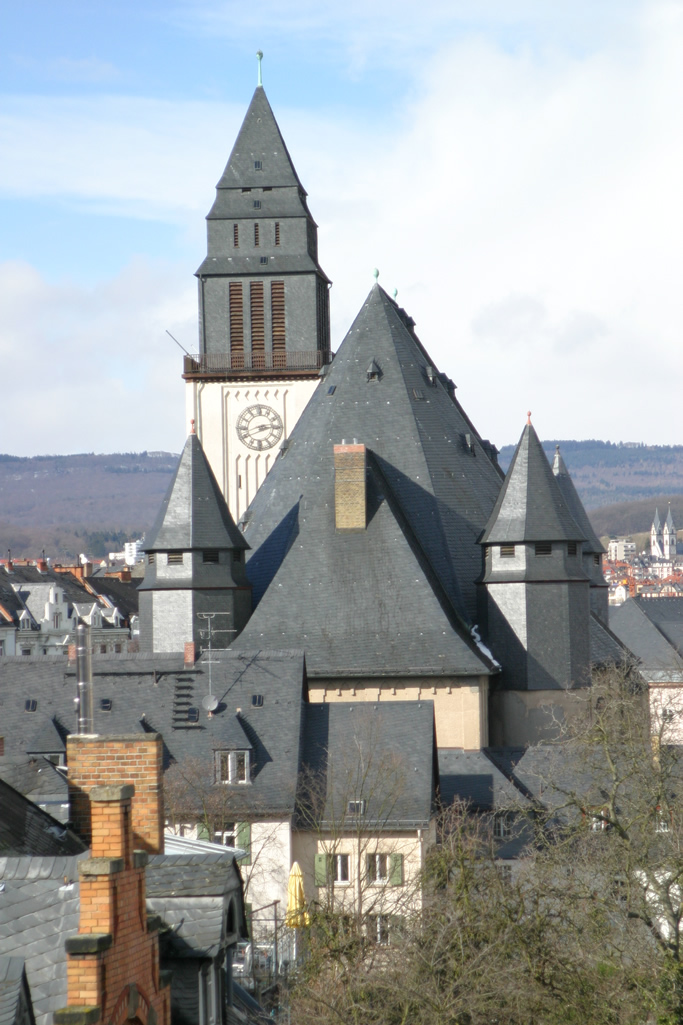
- View of Lutherkirche from the South

Religion
- Affiliation: Protestant Church in Hesse and Nassau
- Year consecrated: 1911

Location
- Location: Wiesbaden, Hesse, Germany
- Interactive map of Lutherkirche
- Coordinates: 50°4′13″N 8°14′16″E

Architecture
- Architect: Friedrich Pützer
- Style: Jugendstil; Romanesque Revival

Specifications
- Direction of façade: west
- Height (max): 35–40 m
- Materials: brick

Website
- lutherkirche-wiesbaden.de

The Lutherkirche (Luther Church) is one of four main Protestant churches in Wiesbaden, the capital of Hesse, Germany. It was built between 1908 and 1910 in Jugendstil (Art Nouveau style in Germany) and in accordance with the Wiesbadener Programm, to a design by Friedrich Pützer. With two organs and good acoustics, it is also a concert venue.

== History ==
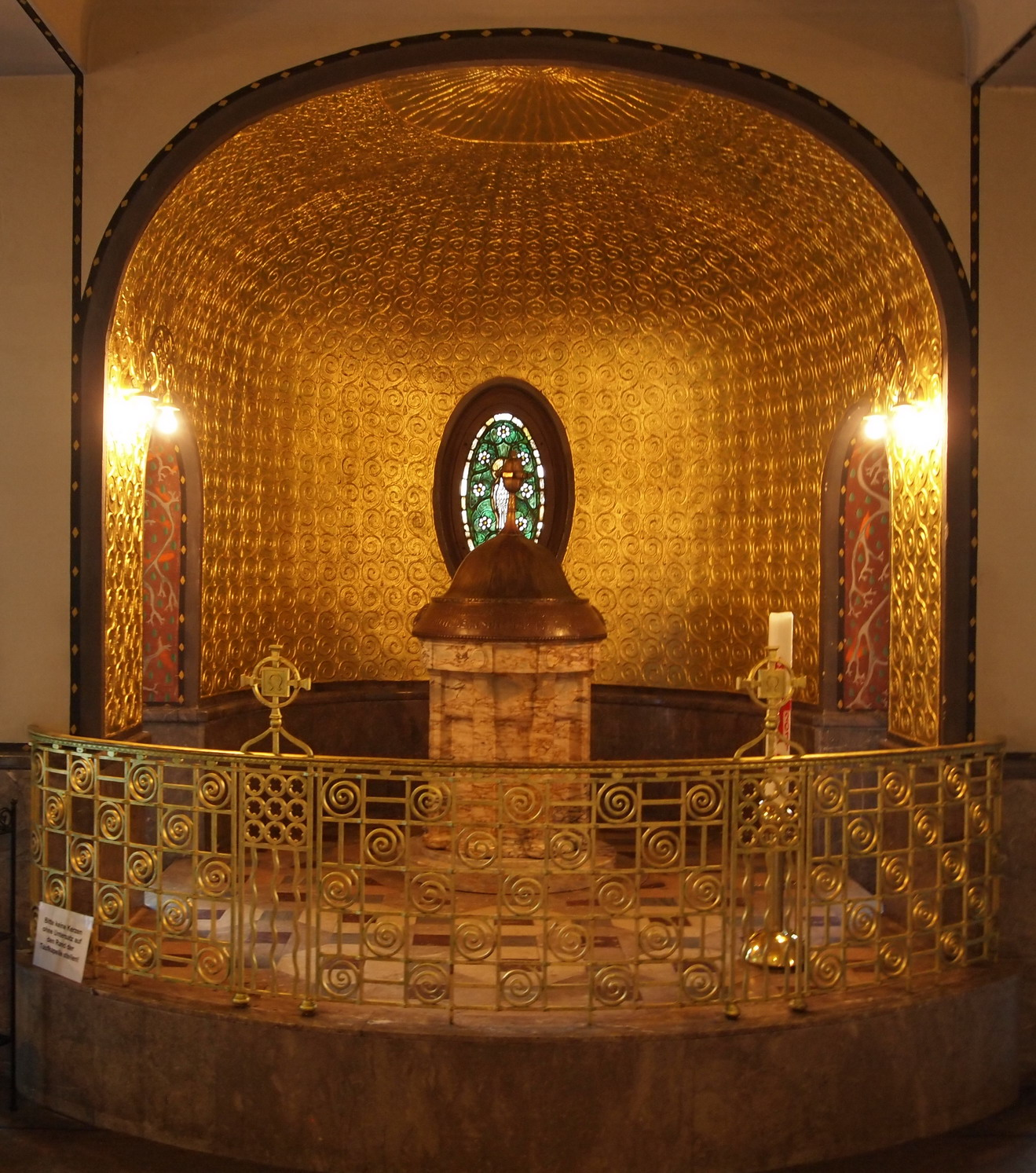
Baptismal chapel

By 1903, population growth in Wiesbaden necessitated the building of a fourth Protestant church. The city already had three: the Marktkirche, the Bergkirche and the Ringkirche. The latest of these, the Ringkirche, had been consecrated only nine years earlier; designed by Johannes Otzen the construction of the church had followed the principles of the Wiesbadener Programm. These principles had met with wide acclaim. They were followed again in the planning of the new church. In 1905 the architectural competition the program required was held. After shortlisting three proposals, the congregation decided on a design by Friedrich Pützer from Darmstadt on 8 June 1906. He was an architect and professor at the Technische Hochschule Darmstadt. Pützer was not associated with the Darmstadt Artists' Colony at the Mathildenhöhe, but shared their interest in overcoming historicism. The jury included the architects Hermann Eggert and Franz Schwechten, the Wiesbaden building inspector Richard Saran and the minister Emil Veesenmeyer, who had developed the Wiesbadener Programm with Johannes Otzen.

The jury ruled:

The ground plan of this design is innovative, and promises to create an exceptionally beautiful interior, plus in all probability good acoustics as well. The exterior has an original and appealing appearance and can be even further adapted with minimal changes to the local architectural style, as has by chance already been seen. In particular, the spires need an alteration, which will anyway occur, as necessary, during further elaboration of the design (…) The design achieves an impressive architectural effect by comparatively simple means, and can be regarded as a significant step forward on the path to advancing Protestant church architecture.

Construction was originally scheduled to begin in July 1907, but was somewhat delayed. Earth was broken on 28 August 1908, a stone-laying ceremony took place on 1 November 1908, and the Lutherkirche was inaugurated on 8 January 1911. The roof of the building was damaged during World War II. Postwar, the colourful interior wallpaintings were covered by whitewash. In the 1980s the walls were restored using the original plans, and the restoration of the church was completed in 1992. The building is of national importance as an example of Jugendstil.

== Architecture ==
=== Exterior ===
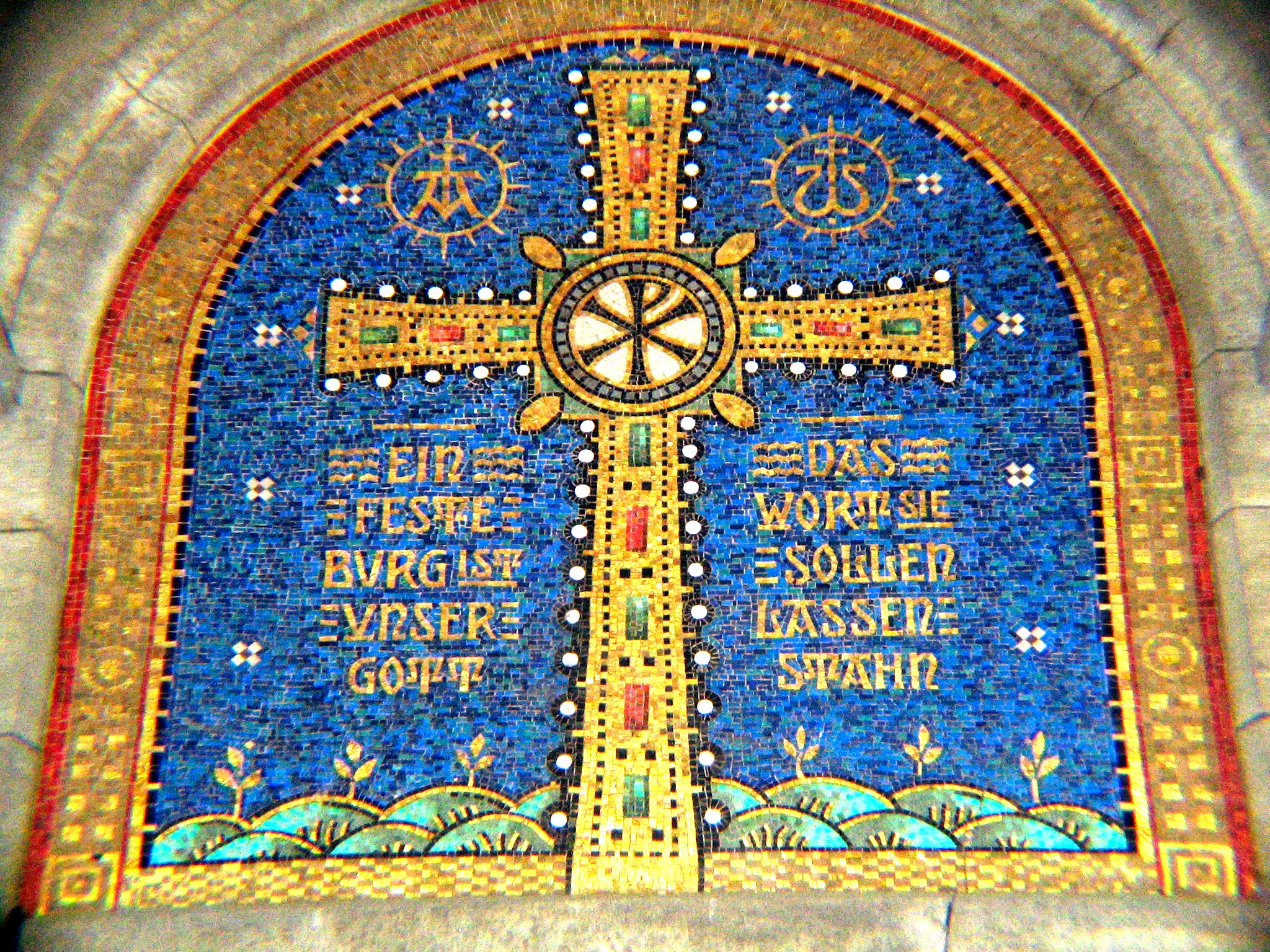
Tympanum, with two quotations from Luther's hymn "Ein feste Burg ist unser Gott"

The Lutherkirche is located off the Gutenbergplatz, right on the Ringstraße. It is built in Jugendstil and has a white plaster facade. The most notable features are the 50 m high tower and the expansive roof, 20 m high with a ridge rising to 37 m, which is supported by a steel construction of a type that was unusual at the time.

The tympanum above the main entrance is a mosaic of the cross, which features two key lines of Martin Luther's hymn "Ein feste Burg ist unser Gott" ("A Mighty Fortress is Our God"), the first line and "Das Wort sie sollen lassen stahn" (The word they still shall let remain). On the cross is the Chi rho and it is flanked by the alpha and omega, symbolising Jesus Christ as the beginning and end of the world and all creation (cf. Revelation 22.13).

The Lutherkirche forms a unified architectural complex with the two parish houses (Mosbacher Straße 4 und Sartoriusstraße 14). Karl Dienst considered it "from the large-scale structure to the smallest detail … a harmoniously composed Gesamtkunstwerk of German Protestant culture." ("von der großen Form bis ins kleinste Detail … als ein harmonisch durchkomponiertes Gesamtkunstwerk des deutschen Kulturprotestantismus".

=== Interior ===
The inner space of the Lutherkirche is decorated according to the rules of the Wiesbadener Programm, which says that the three parts of the church service – the altar (for the Eucharist), pulpit (for the sermon) and organ (for the music) – should be arranged next to each other in the centre and the participants in the service should be arranged around these three elements.

The church has 1,200 seats, spanned by a rib vault supported by four columns. The interior is shaped like a long oval, sloping down lightly over the altar space. Jugendstil ornamentation decorates the wood panelling on the walls, the ceiling and the matroneum. All the windows and the paintwork, as well as the bridal staircase, were made by Otto Linnemann of Frankfurt in 1911; many relevant documents are preserved in the Linneman archive.

== Organs and church music ==
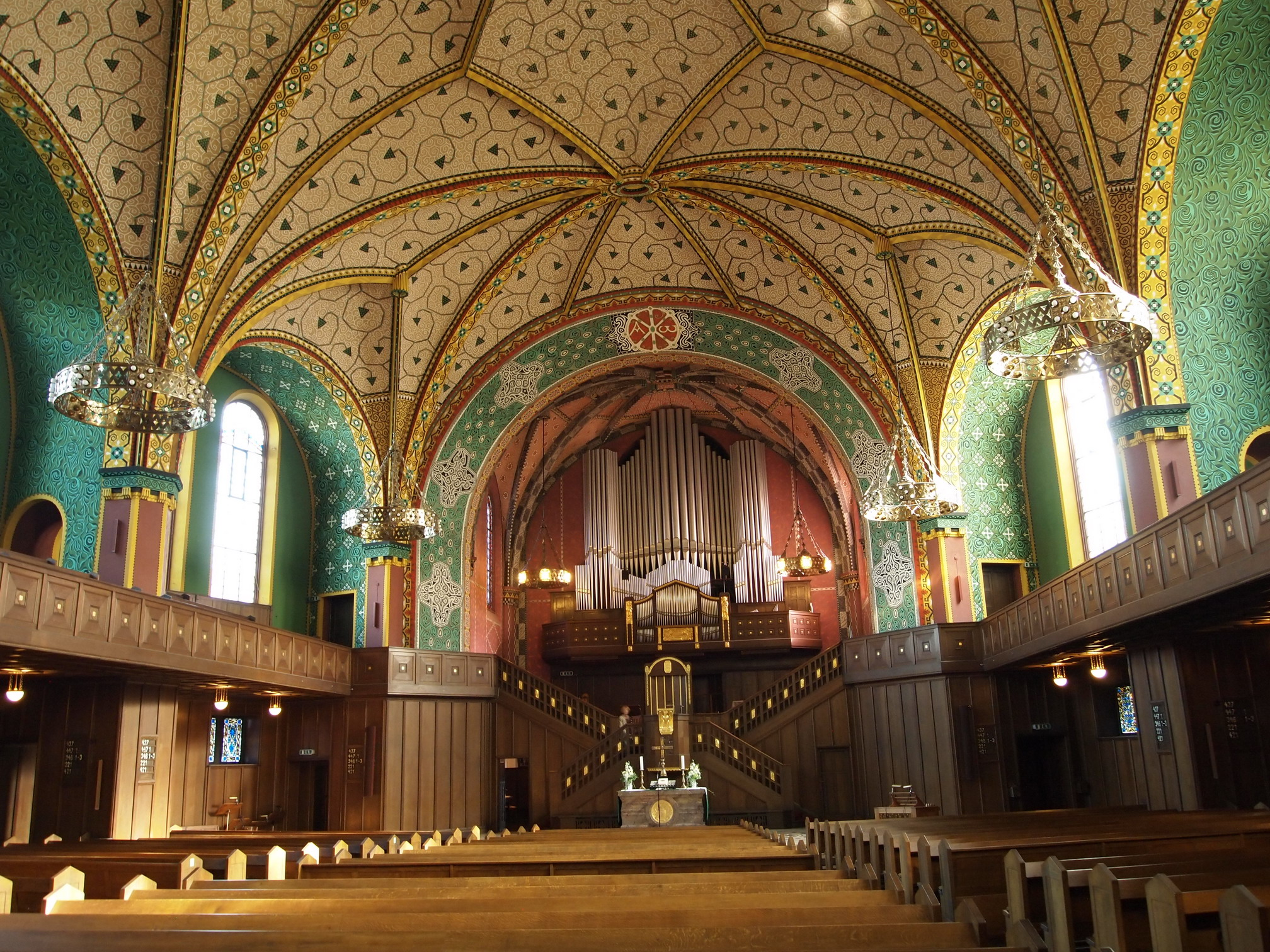
View towards the altar with the 1911 Walcker organ above it and the small positive organ on the right

The church has three organs. The organ firm Walcker completed an instrument with three manuals in 1911. It is placed behind the altar and regarded as part of the Gesamtkunstwerk, as envisioned in the Wiesbadener Programm.

In the mid-1970s the Walcker organ was in such poor condition that a new organ was commissioned. The job of building a new organ in the gallery over the entrance went to Klais Orgelbau of Bonn. The new organ was consecrated in 1979. It has three manuals (like the Walcker organ), over 44 registers, mechanical tracker key action and electrical stop action.

In the 1980s, when the original Jugendstil interior decoration was being restored, it was decided to restore completely the old Walcker organ from 1911 as well. The preservation of the instrument has historical value, especially important as most Walcker organs in Frankfurt were destroyed in the war. The German Republic and the State of Hesse helped fund the project, which was carried out from 1986 to 1987, by Klais. The organ was reconsecrated in 1987. It has 46 registers, with electrical key and stop action. The historic Walcker organ has been used for recordings of music of the period, such as Martin Schmeding's recording of the organ works by Max Reger.

There is also a positive organ near the altar to accompany the choir, built in 1984 by Thomas Jann (Regensburg) and equipped with 4½ organ stops.

The church has a choir, the Bachchor Wiesbaden, a Kinder- und Jugend-Kantorei (children's and youth chorale) and a Posaunenchor. Good acoustics and organs suiting all styles make the church a venue for church concerts, including a venue of the Rheingau Musik Festival which held in 2015 a concert with the Thomanerchor, conducted by Gotthold Schwarz, and in 2022 a concert with that choir and its new conductor Andreas Reize.
