= Wiesbadener Programm =

Protestant church architectural program

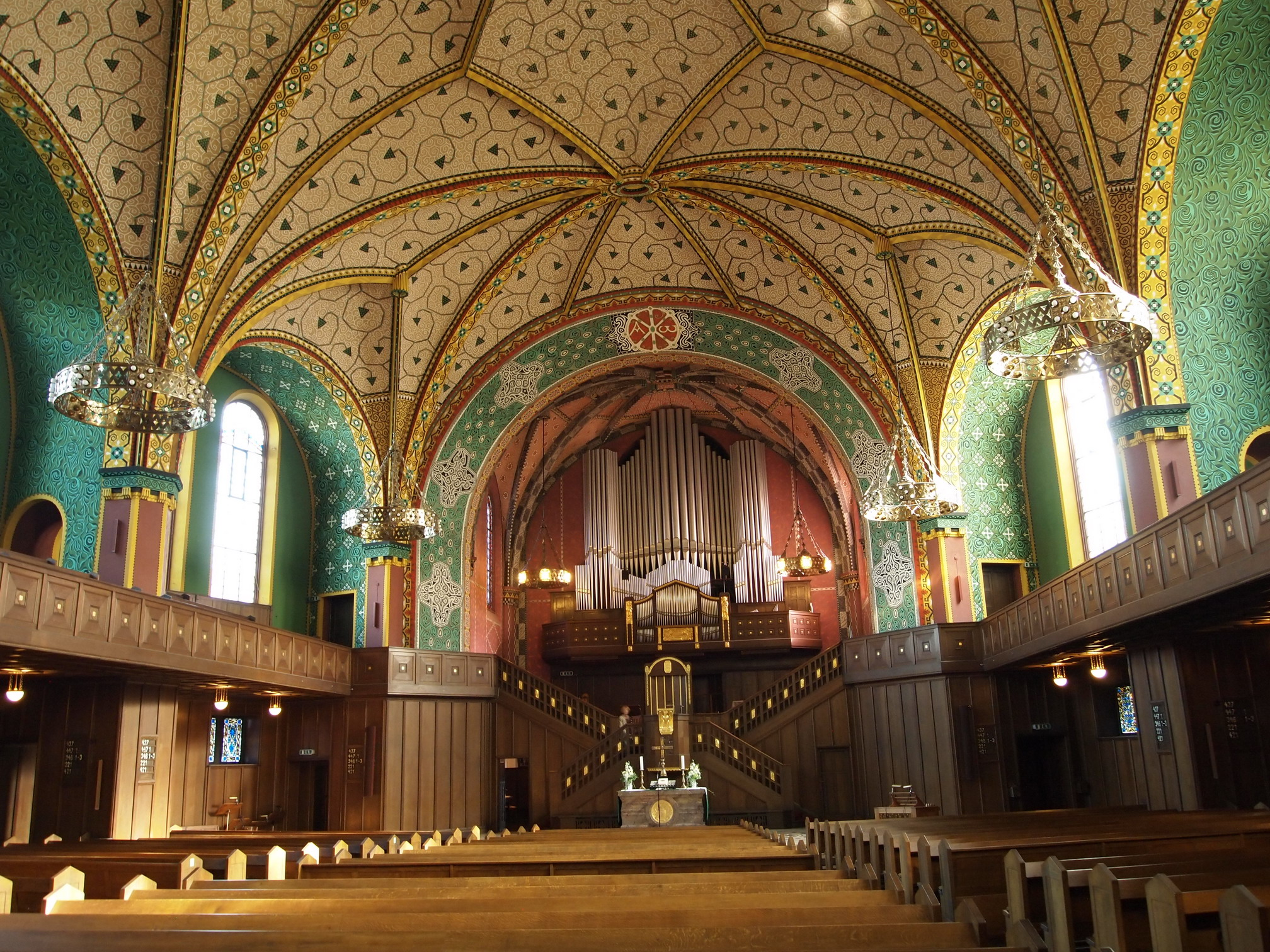
Lutherkirche in Wiesbaden, showing the concentration on a unity of pulpit, altar, and organ

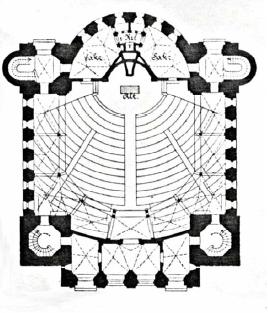
Plan of the Cemetery Church in Elberfeld

The Wiesbadener Programm (Wiesbaden program) is a program for Protestant church architecture developed in Wiesbaden, the capital of Hesse, Germany, in the late 19th century. It contradicted an older Eisenacher Regulativ (Eisenach rule) from 1861 which demanded that new church buildings had to follow Romanesque Revival style or Gothic Revival style.

The program was initiated by Emil Veesenmeyer, minister of the Bergkirche, and Johannes Otzen, an architect who designed the Ringkirche (1892–94) as the first church following the principles of the program. A focus is the unity of pulpit, altar, and organ, which should be together and visible from every seat for the congregation.

Churches which follow the program include in Wiesbaden also the Lutherkirche (1907–10), in Hannover the Lutherkirche (1895–98), in Elberfeld the Cemetery Church (1894–98), in Basel the Pauluskirche (1898–1901), and in Bern the Pauluskirche (1902–05), among several buildings throughout Germany and also in Switzerland.

== Literature ==
- Emil Veesenmeyer: Der Kirchenbau des Protestantismus und das sogenannte Wiesbadener Programm. Evangelisches Gemeindeblatt, Dillenburg 1895
- Evangelische Hauptkirche zu Rheydt 1902–2002 ISBN 3-00-010531-X. Darin die Artikel
  - Peter Seyfried: Johannes Otzens opus ultimum
  - Holger Brülls: Die Modernität rückwärtsgewandten Bauens
- Anne Heinig: Die Krise des Historismus in der deutschen Sakraldekoration im späten 19. Jahrhundert Regensburg 2004.
- Urs Baur:Zur Restaurierung der Kirche Bühl 1983–1984.
- Ralf-Andreas Gmelin: Der Dom der kleinen Leute, Kirchenführer und Baugeschichte Wiesbaden, 3rd edition, 2008.
- Peter Genz: Das Wiesbadener Programm. Johannes Otzen und die Geschichte eines Kirchenbautyps zwischen 1891 und 1930. Kiel 2011, ISBN 978-3-86935-056-1.
