= Situational analysis =

Situational analysis may refer to:

- Situational analysis or situation analysis, a set of decision-making methods in strategic management
- Situational analysis or situational logic, the analysis of a cognitive agent's problem situation as advanced by Karl Popper
- Situational analysis, an extension of the grounded theory method of analysis for qualitative research
