= Klaus Uwe Ludwig =

German organist (1943–2019)

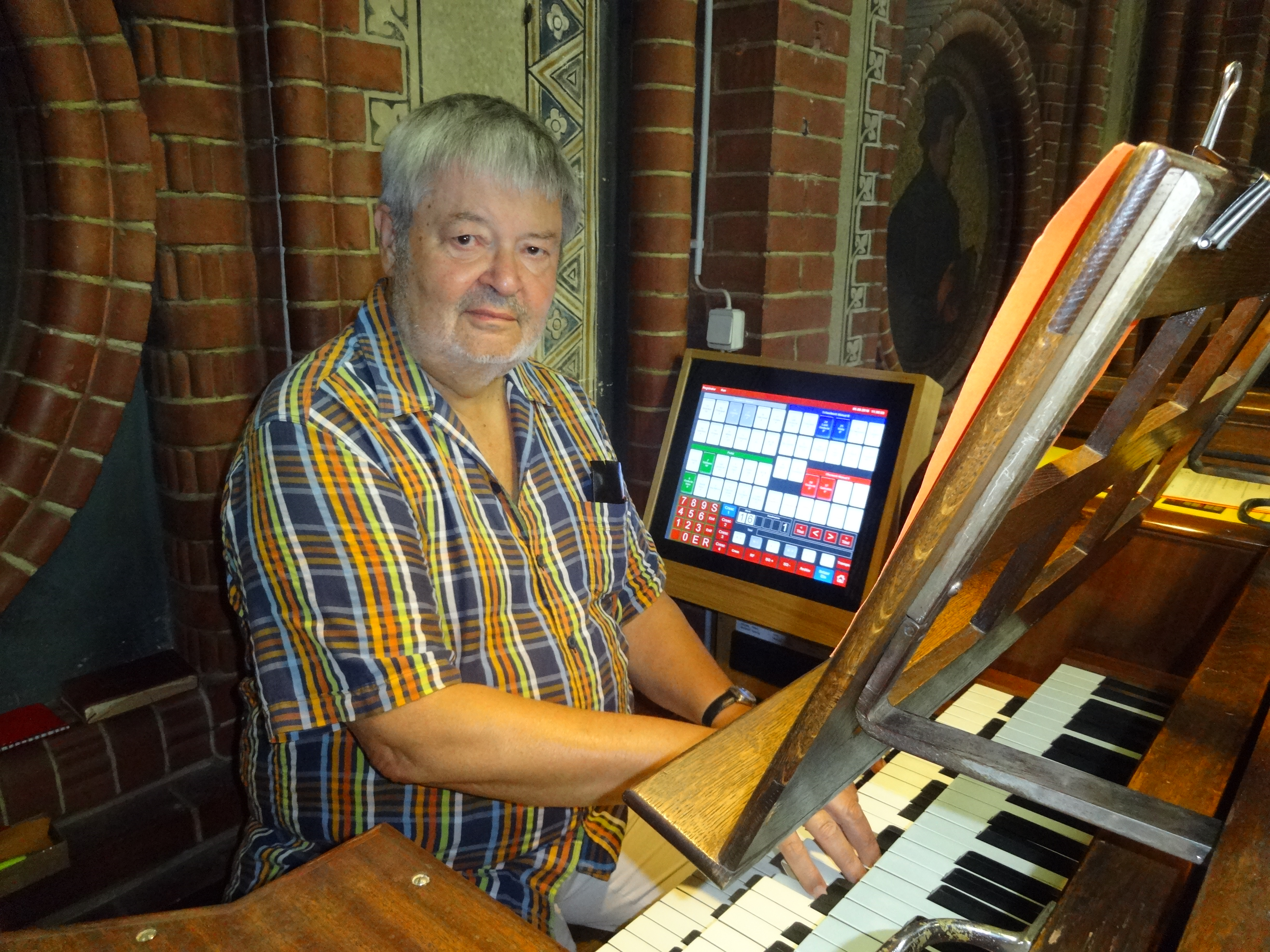
- Klaus Uwe Ludwig in Bergkirche, Wiesbaden 2016
- Born: 16 September 1943; Göttingen, Germany
- Died: 20 December 2019 (aged 76); Wiesbaden, Germany
- Education: University of Mannheim; Hochschule für Kirchenmusik Heidelberg
- Occupations: Choral conductor; Concert organist; Composer
- Organizations: Lutherkirche, Wiesbaden

Klaus Uwe Ludwig (16 September 1943 – 20 December 2019) was a German church musician, concert organist and composer, who directed the church music at the Lutherkirche in Wiesbaden for decades.

== Career ==
Ludwig was born in Göttingen. He studied first mathematics and physics in Mannheim, then Protestant church music at the Hochschule für Kirchenmusik Heidelberg. He graduated in 1966 with the A-Exam, in 1967 with the concert diploma. He also studied voice and orchestral conducting in Mannheim. He worked at the Melanchthonkirche in Mannheim, the Stadtkirche in Kitzingen and for the regional Stadt- und Bezirkskantorat in Regensburg. He was promoted to Kirchenmusikdirektor in 1977. From 1978 to the end of 2008 he was Kantor (director of music) at the Lutherkirche in Wiesbaden. He founded and conducted the Bachchor Wiesbaden, the Bach orchestra, the Kleine Kantorei (Little chorale) and the Johann-Walter-Kreis, an ensemble for Renaissance music, especially sacred and secular music of Luther's time. In 2003, the Bachchor received the Kulturpreis der Stadt Wiesbaden (Cultural prize of Wiesbaden).

Ludwig conducted performances of oratorios, including less-known works and premieres. He performed around 125 Bach cantatas in services. As a concert organist, he performed compositions of all eras, including Bach's complete works (played twice) and Max Reger's complete works. He played premieres of organ work by Zsolt Gárdonyi, Theo Brandmüller, Harald Genzmer, Claus Kühnl, Rolf Schweizer and his own compositions. He also worked as a singer (bass-baritone), pianist, instrument builder, stage director, arranger, librettist, author and editor.

== Recordings ==
- 1981 Johann Sebastian Bach: Dritter Teil der Clavier-Uebung (Bestenliste der deutschen Schallplattenkritik)
- 1985 Zoltán Gárdonyi: Orgelwerke
- 1989 Sigfrid Karg-Ehlert: Bilder vom Bodensee
- 1995 Johann Sebastian Bach: Leipziger Choräle
