= Wiesbaden-Rheingauviertel =

Rheingauviertel
- Borough of Wiesbaden
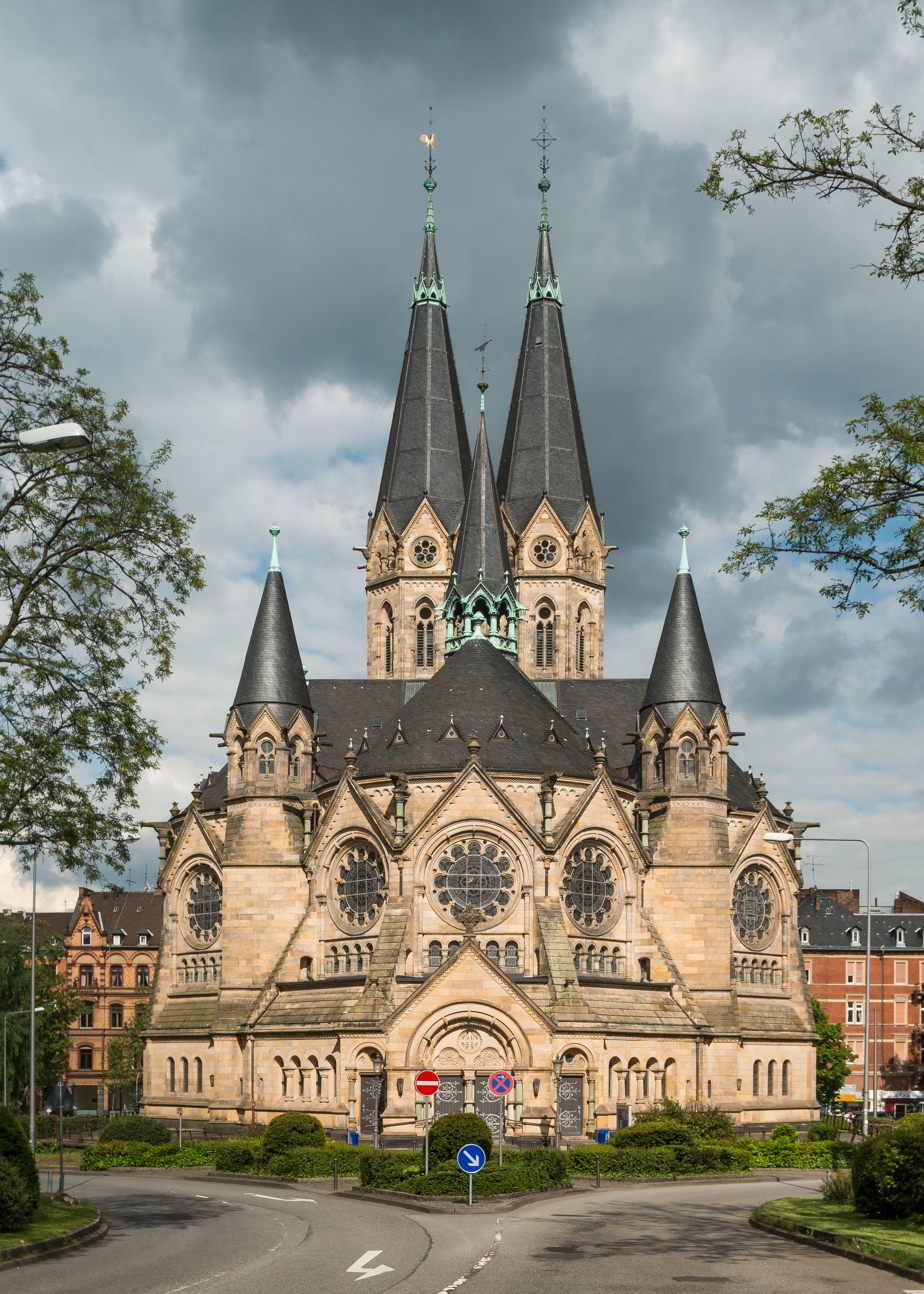
- Ringkirche in the eastern part of Rheingauviertel, at the border to Westend borough

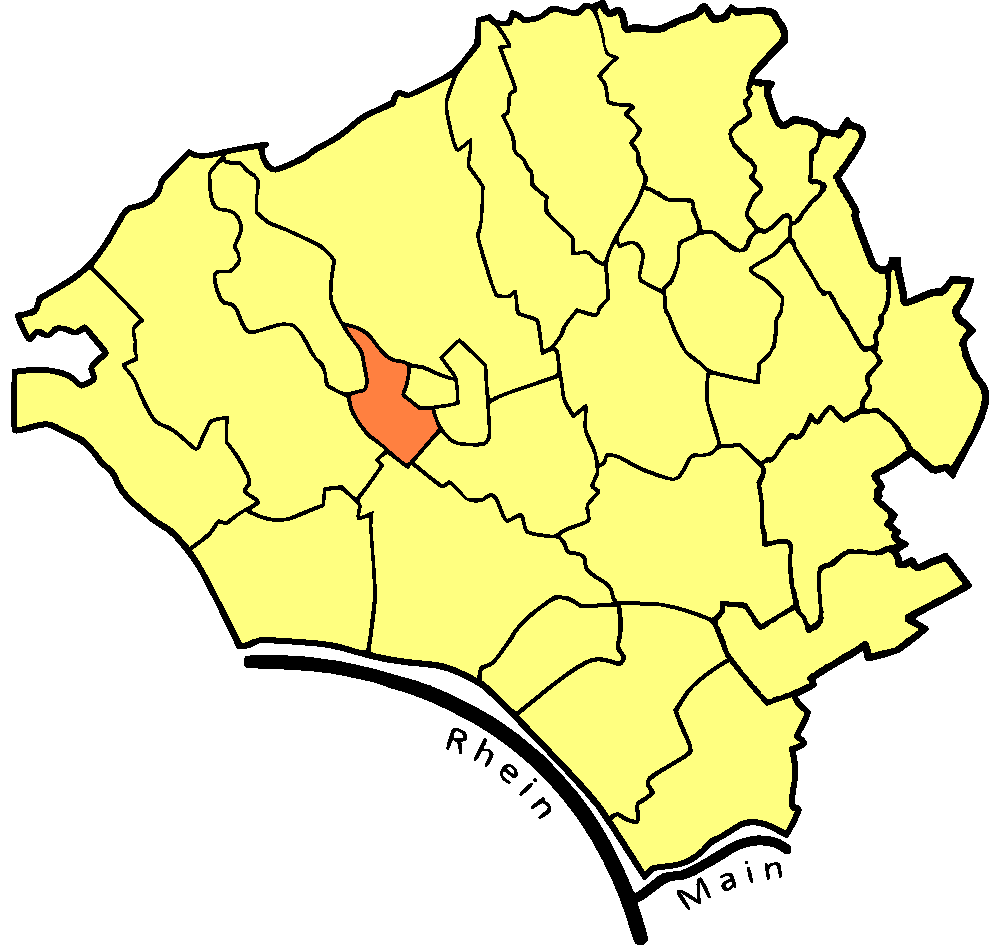
- Location of Rheingauviertel in Wiesbaden
- Interactive map of Rheingauviertel
- Location within Germany Location within Hesse
- Coordinates: 50°04′32″N 8°13′36″E
- Country: Germany
- State: Hesse
- District: Urban district
- City: Wiesbaden

Government
  - Mayor: Dorothée Riemeier (Greens)

Area
  - Total: 2.47 km^{2} (0.95 sq mi)

Population (2020-12-31)
  - Total: 22,511
  - Density: 9,110/km^{2} (23,600/sq mi)
- Time zone: UTC+01:00 (CET)
  - Summer (DST): UTC+02:00 (CEST)
- Postal codes: 65185, 65187, 65195, 65197
- Dialling codes: 0611

Rheingauviertel is a borough of the city of Wiesbaden, Hesse, Germany. With over 22,000 inhabitants, it is one of the most-populated of Wiesbaden's boroughs. It is located in the centre of the city. It is named after the wine region Rheingau to the west of Wiesbaden.
