= Bergkirche, Wiesbaden =

Church building in Wiesbaden, Germany

Bergkirche
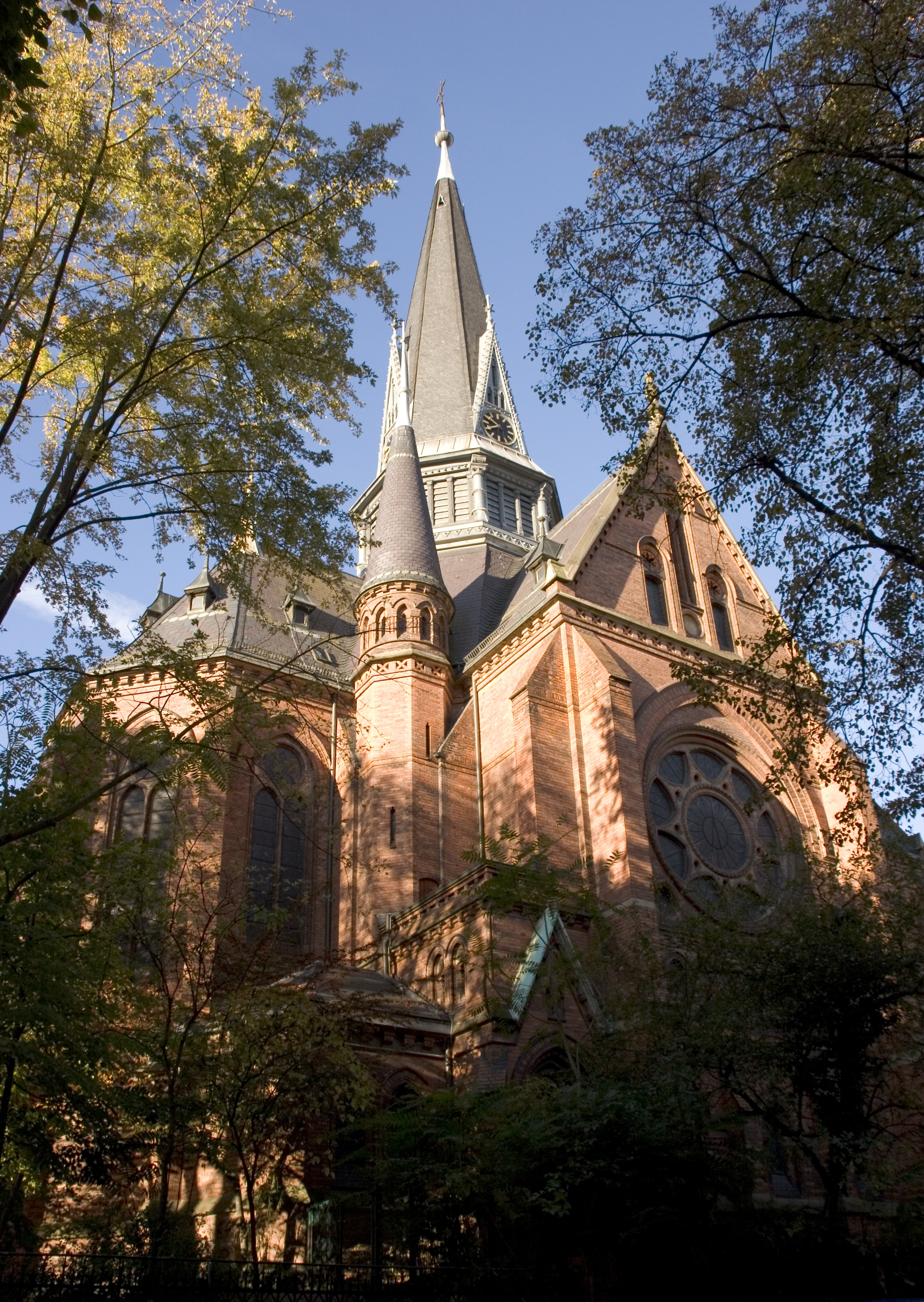

Religion
- Affiliation: Protestant Church in Hesse and Nassau
- Ecclesiastical or organizational status: Parish church

Location
- Location: Wiesbaden, Hesse, Germany
- Interactive map of Bergkirche
- Coordinates: 50°5′12″N 8°14′23″E

Architecture
- Architect: Johannes Otzen
- Style: Gothic Revival
- Completed: 1879

Website
- www.ringkirche.de

The Bergkirche (Mountain Church) is one of four main Protestant churches in Wiesbaden, the capital of Hesse, Germany. It was completed in 1879 in Gothic Revival based on a design by Johannes Otzen. The church is focused on having the altar and pulpit close to the congregation, following Luther's concept of a universal priesthood. It also serves as a concert venue for church music.

== History ==
Plans for a second Protestant church, after the Marktkirche, date back to 1837, but were not realised until decades later, due to the two wars (Austro-Prussian War and Franco-Prussian War) that Prussia had to fight between 1866 and 1871. Building began in 1876, and was completed in 1879. The Protestant Bergkirche was built in Gothic revival style, designed by Johannes Otzen who would write the Wiesbadener Programm. The building process was supervised by Hans Grisebach. It was named Bergkirche because it was built on a high plateau within Wiesbaden's inner city, and the surrounding quarter is named after the church. The steeple, with a slate roof, dominates the area.

The Wiesbadener Programm was written by Otzen and Emil Veesenmeyer, minister of the Bergkirche, in 1891, aiming at an unobstructed view from every seat in the church to the combined location of altar, pulpit and organ. The third Protestant church in Wiesbaden, the Ringkirche, followed this program, completed in 1894 after Otzen's design, as well as the fourth church, the Lutherkirche, opened in 1911.

== Architecture ==
The building recalls elements of a 13th-century parish church. Olten followed the "Eisenacher Regulativ", an official regulation for church buildings which required, as in a Gothic church, a cross as a floorplan and the choir to the east. He shortened the nave and made the transept octagonal, as the central focus for altar and pulpit close to the congregation. The result is a protestantische Predigtkirche (Protestant sermon church) according to Martin Luther's concept of a priesthood of all believers. The interior features paintings, stained-glass windows and sculptures.

== Church music ==
A first pipe organ was built in the Bergkirche in 1879 by E. F. Walcker & Cie. It was replaced in 1931 by G. F. Steinmeyer & Co. from Oettingen in Bayern, but retaining the front and a few stops. Albert Schweitzer was consulted for the rebuilding of the organ. In 1948, the organ was remodelled by Förster & Nicolaus Orgelbau. A new organ was built in 2016 by Claudius Winterhalter, with 40 stops on three manuals and pedal.

The church has a mixed choir, Kantorei der Bergkirche, conducted by Christian Pfeifer, which performs in services and in concerts such as in 2019 Arvo Pärt's Johannespassion with Klaus Uwe Ludwig as the organist, and Handel's Messiah as part of the Wiesbadener Bachwochen festival.

== Gallery ==
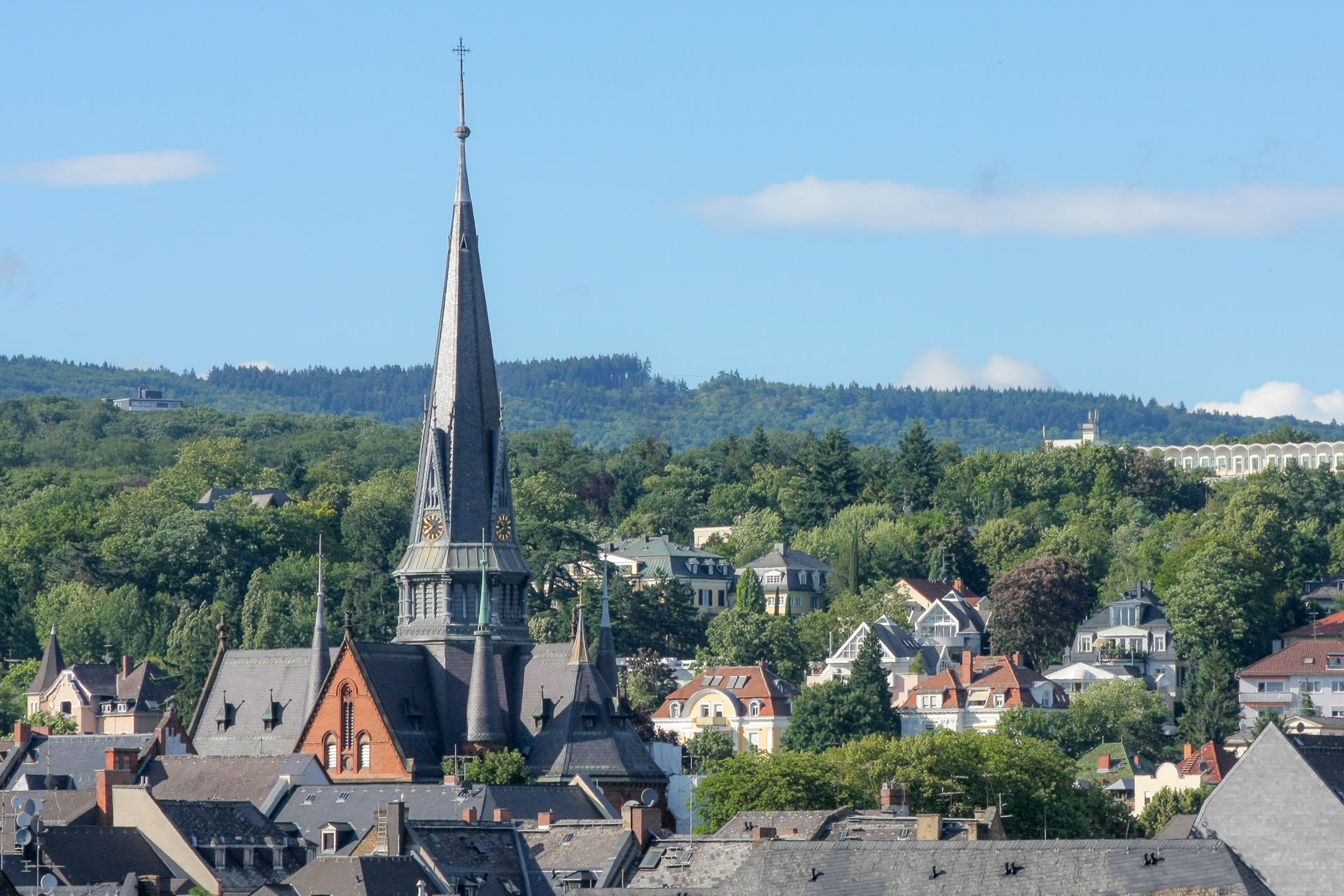
The Bergkirche in the quarter named after it

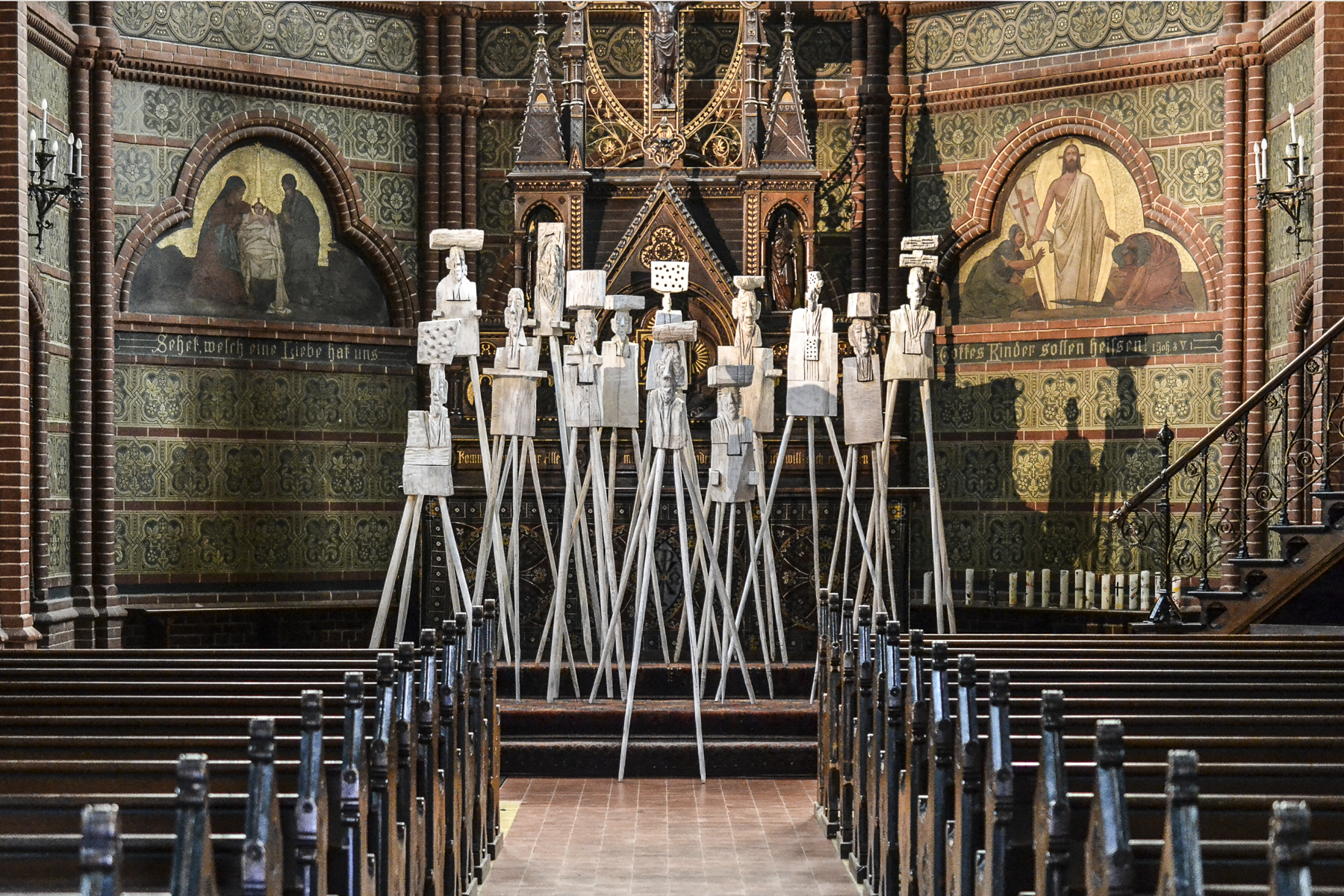
Choir, with a temporary art exhibit

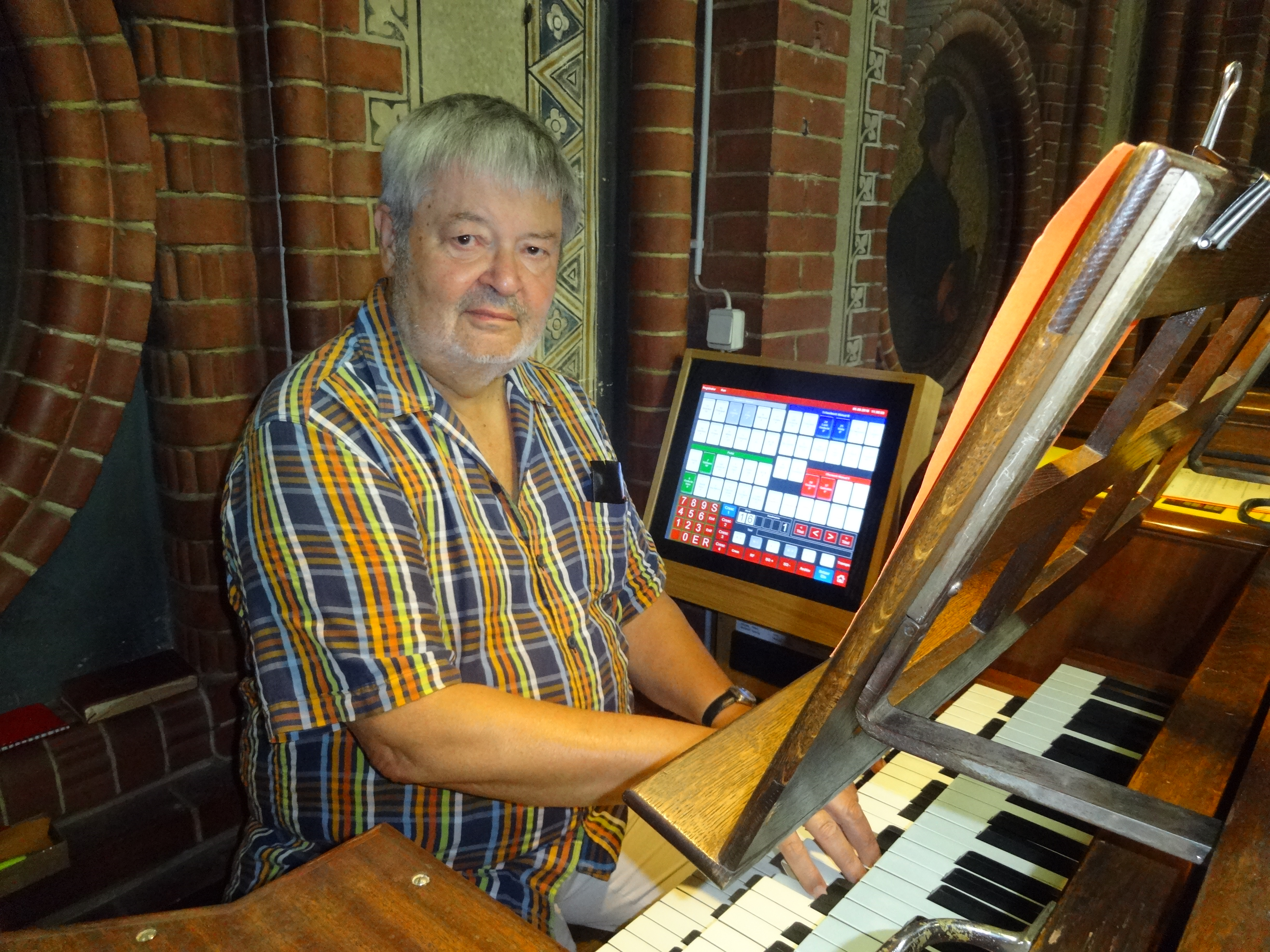
Klaus Uwe Ludwig at the organ, September 2016
