= Bachchor Wiesbaden =

- Choir
- Origin: Lutherkirche, Wiesbaden
- Founded: 1978
- Genre: Mixed church choir
- Members: 80
- Chief conductor: Niklas Sikner
- Awards: Kulturpreis der Landeshauptstadt Wiesbaden
- Website: Homepage Bachchor Wiesbaden

The Bachchor Wiesbaden is a mixed choir at the Protestant Lutherkirche in Wiesbaden, the state capital of Hesse, Germany. They perform oratorios, motets and cantatas, both in the liturgy and concert. The perform also on international concert tours and in partnership with a choir in Royal Tunbridge Wells.

== History ==
Choral singing had already a long tradition at the Lutherkirche, when Klaus Uwe Ludwig, who was Kirchenmusikdirektor from 1977, founded the choir of around 60 singers in September 1978. They perform works by Johann Sebastian Bach, popular oratorios and also less known music, which they partly recorded on CD.

The choir made concert tours to Danzig, Paris, to the US and England. A partnership with the Royal Tunbridge Wells Choral Society in Royal Tunbridge Wells, the British sister city of Wiesbaden, was begun in 1994 and led to concerts of the combined choirs in both cities.

The choir has been directed by Niklas Sikner from November 2020. It is sponsored by an association of friends (Freundeskreis).

== Awards ==
- 2003 Kulturpreis der Landeshauptstadt Wiesbaden (Culture prize of the state capital Wiesbaden)
