= List of Rheingau Musik Festival locations =

The Rheingau Musik Festival is an annual international summer music festival in Germany, founded in 1987. It is mostly dedicated to classical music, but includes other genres. Concerts take place at culturally important locations in the wine-growing Rheingau region between Wiesbaden and Lorch.

Name	Town	Image	First	Type	Hall	Events
Eberbach Abbey	Eltville		1987	Church	Basilika, Cloisters, Dormitorium, Laiendormitorium	opening concert, closing concert
Schloss Johannisberg	Johannisberg		1987	Schloss	Ostflügel, Basilika, Court	chamber music, summer feast
St. Martin	Lorch		1987	Church		organ concerts
Rheingauer Dom	Geisenheim		1987	Church		
Marktkirche	Wiesbaden		1987	Church		sacred music
Kurhaus	Wiesbaden		1987	Concert hall	Friedrich-von-Thiersch-Saal	Orchestral concerts
Schloss Vollrads	Johannisberg			Schloss, garden, lake stage		jazz
Eibingen Abbey	Eibingen			Church		vocal ensembles
St. Valentin	Kiedrich			Church		
St. Ägidius	Mittelheim			Church		
St. Georg und Katharina	Wiesbaden-Frauenstein			Church		
Parkhotel	Schlangenbad					
Lutherkirche	Wiesbaden			Church		sacred vocal music
Ringkirche	Wiesbaden			Church		vocal music
Unionskirche	Idstein			Church		vocal music
St. Jakobus	Rüdesheim			Church		
Mariä Himmelfahrt	Hallgarten			Church		
St. Martinus	Hattersheim		2022	Church		Voces8
Alte Oper	Frankfurt am Main					
Kurpark, Wiesbaden	Wiesbaden					
Schlachthof	Wiesbaden			culture centre		
Rheingoldhalle	Mainz			concert hall		
Casals Forum	Kronberg		2023	concert hall		
KING	Ingelheim		2023	culture centre		
Rettershof	Kelkheim			estate		
Künstler	Hochheim			winery		
Erlöserkirche	Bad Homburg		2026	Church		Tenebrae
