= The Poverty of Historicism =

1944 book by Karl Popper

- Author: Karl Popper
- Language: English
- Subject: Historicism
- Publisher: Routledge
- Publication date: 1944; 1957
- Publication place: United Kingdom
- Media type: Print (Hardcover and Paperback)
- Pages: 166 (1994 Routledge edition)
- ISBN: 0-415-06569-0 (1994 Routledge edition)
- OCLC: 564446907

The Poverty of Historicism is a 1944 book by the philosopher Karl Popper (revised in 1957), in which the author argues that the idea of historicism is dangerous and bankrupt.

== Publication ==
The Poverty of Historicism was first written as a paper which was read in 1936, then updated, published in a series of articles in Economica in 1944, and published as a book in English in 1957. It was dedicated “In memory of the countless men and women of all creeds or nations or races who fell victim to the fascist and communist belief in Inexorable Laws of Historical Destiny.” The title is a reference to Marx's book The Poverty of Philosophy (1847), itself a reference to Proudhon's book The Philosophy of Poverty (1846).

== Synopsis ==
The book is a treatise on scientific method in the social sciences. Popper defines historicism as “an approach to the social sciences which assumes that historical prediction is their principal aim…”. He also remarks that “[t]he belief … that it is the task of the social sciences to lay bare the law of evolution of society in order to foretell its future… might be described as the central historicist doctrine.”

Popper distinguishes two main strands of historicism, a “pro-naturalistic” approach which “favours the application of the methods of physics” and the “anti-naturalistic” approach which opposes these methods. The first two parts of the book contain Popper's exposition of historicist views (both pro- and anti-naturalistic), and the second two parts contain his criticism of them. Popper concludes by contrasting the antiquity of historicism (which, for example, Plato is said to have espoused) with the claims of modernity made by its twentieth-century adherents.

== Popper's criticism of historicism ==
Popper's critique of the poverty of the idea of historical prediction can broadly be split into three areas: fundamental problems with the idea itself, common inconsistencies in the arguments of historicists, and the negative practical effects of implementing historicist ideas.

=== Fundamental problems with historicist theory ===
I) A description of the whole of society is impossible because the list of characteristics making up such a description would be infinite. If we cannot know the whole of the present state of mankind it follows that we cannot know the future of mankind.

“If we wish to study a thing, we are bound to select certain aspects of it. It is not possible for us to observe or to describe a whole piece of the world, or a whole piece of nature; in fact, not even the smallest whole piece may be so described, since all description is necessarily selective.”

II) Human history is a single unique event. Knowledge of the past therefore does not necessarily help one to know the future. “The evolution of life on earth, or of human society, is a unique historical process… Its description, however, is not a law, but only a singular historical statement.”

Study of history may reveal trends. However, there is no guarantee that these trends will continue. In other words: they are not laws; “a statement asserting the existence of a trend at a certain time and place would be a singular historical statement and not a universal law.”

In addition, given that historians are interested in the uniqueness of past events, it may be said that future events will possess a uniqueness that cannot be known in advance.

III) Individual human action or reaction can never be predicted with certainty, therefore neither can the future: “The human factor is the ultimately uncertain and wayward element in social life and in all social institutions. Indeed, this is the element which ultimately cannot be completely controlled by institutions (as Spinoza first saw); for every attempt at controlling it completely must lead to tyranny; which means, to the omnipotence of the human factor – the whims of a few men, or even one.”

Popper asserts that psychology cannot lead to a complete understanding of “the human factor” because “'human nature' varies considerably with the social institutions, and its study therefore presupposes an understanding of these institutions.”

IV) A law, natural (i.e. scientific) or social, may enable us to exclude the possibility of certain events but it does not allow us to narrow down the range of possible outcomes to only one. This follows from Popper’s theory of science: a hypothesis is proposed (it does not matter how the hypothesis was derived) and is then subjected to rigorous tests which aim to disprove the hypothesis. If no tests disprove the hypothesis it may become known as a law but in fact remains simply a so-far-unfalsified hypothesis.

Equally, examples of where theories are correct are useless in proving the validity of the theory.

V) It is logically impossible to know the future course of history when that course depends in part on the future growth of scientific knowledge (which is unknowable in advance).

=== Common inconsistencies in the arguments of historicists ===
I) Historicists often require the remodelling of man to become fit for the future society or hasten the arrival of this society. Given that society is composed of mankind, remaking man for a particular society can lead to any type of society. Also, a need to remodel man suggests that without this remodelling, the new society may not come about, and is therefore not inevitable.

II) Historicists are bad at imagining conditions under which an identified trend ceases. Historical generalisations may be reduced to a set of laws of higher generality (i.e. one could say that history depends upon psychology). However, in order to form predictions from these generalisations we also need specific initial conditions. To the extent that conditions change or are changing, any "law" may apply differently and trends may disappear.

III) Historicism tends to mistake historical interpretations for theories. When studying history we can only examine a limited aspect of the past. In other words, we must apply a historical interpretation. It is necessary to appreciate a plurality of valid interpretations (although some may be more fertile than others).

IV) Confusing ends with aims. Historicism tends to foster the idea that the aims of society are discernible in the trends of history, or what will inevitably come to pass becomes that which should come to pass. The aims of society may be more usefully thought as a matter of choice for that society.

=== Negative practical effects of implementing historicist ideas ===
I) Unintended consequences. The implementation of historicist programs such as Marxism often means a fundamental change to society. Due to the complexity of social interaction this results in many unintended consequences (i.e. it tends not to work properly). Equally it becomes impossible to tease out the cause of any given effect so nothing is learnt from the experiment/revolution.

II) Lack of information. Large scale social experiments cannot increase our knowledge of the social process because as power is centralised to enable theories to put into practice, dissent must be repressed, and so it is harder and harder to find out what people really think, and so whether the utopian experiment is working properly. This assumes that a dictator in such a position could be benevolent and not corrupted by the accumulation of power, which may be doubted.

In addition, Popper rejects the notion that history cannot be subject to experiment and that any "laws of history" can only apply to a particular historical period. Both of these ideas are treated as typical of the anti-naturalistic historicist approaches by Popper.

=== Positive side to historicism ===
Popper concedes that historicism has an appeal as an antidote to the idea that history is shaped by the actions of "great men."

=== Popper's alternative ===
As an alternative to historicism, Popper puts forward his own preference for “piecemeal social engineering” whereby small and reversible changes are made to society in order to be best able to learn from the changes made. The unpredictability of the future makes the effect of any larger changes random and untraceable. Small changes enable one to make limited, but testable and therefore falsifiable statements about the effect of social actions.

== Reception ==
When published as a book in 1957, The Poverty of Historicism was hailed by the anti-communist author Arthur Koestler as "Probably the only book published this year which will outlive the century." The libertarian theorist Tom G. Palmer has described the work as "brilliant".

Popper's usage of "historicism" has been criticized as differing significantly from the normal definition of the word. That is, amongst historians themselves, a historicist is normally someone whose methodology is cautiously hermeneutical and exegetical, rather than predictive and speculative. This is perhaps closer to what Popper calls "historism."

The Marxist philosopher Karel Kosík criticizes Popper's statement that "All knowledge, whether intuitive or discursive must be of abstract aspects, and we can never grasp the 'concrete structure of reality itself'." Kosík refers to him as "a leading contemporary opponent of the philosophy of concrete totality", and clarifies that, "Totality indeed does not signify all facts. Totality signifies reality as structured dialectical whole, within which any particular fact (or any group or set of facts) can be rationally comprehended" as "the cognition of a fact or of a set of facts is the cognition of their place in the totality of reality." He considers Popper's work to be a part of atomist–rationalist theories of reality. Kosík declares: "Opinions as to whether cognition of all facts is knowable or not are based on the rationalist–empiricist idea that cognition proceeds by the analytic–summative method. This idea is in turn based on the atomist idea of reality as a sum of things, processes and facts." Kosík also suggests that Popper and like-minded thinkers, including Ferdinand Gonseth of Dialectica and Friedrich Hayek on The Counter-Revolution of Science, lack an understanding of dialectical processes and how they form a totality.

== See also ==
- Genealogy (philosophy)
- On the Genealogy of Morality
- Genetic fallacy
- Essentialism
- Evolutionary debunking
- Situational logic
