= Parametric determinism =

Marxist interpretation of history

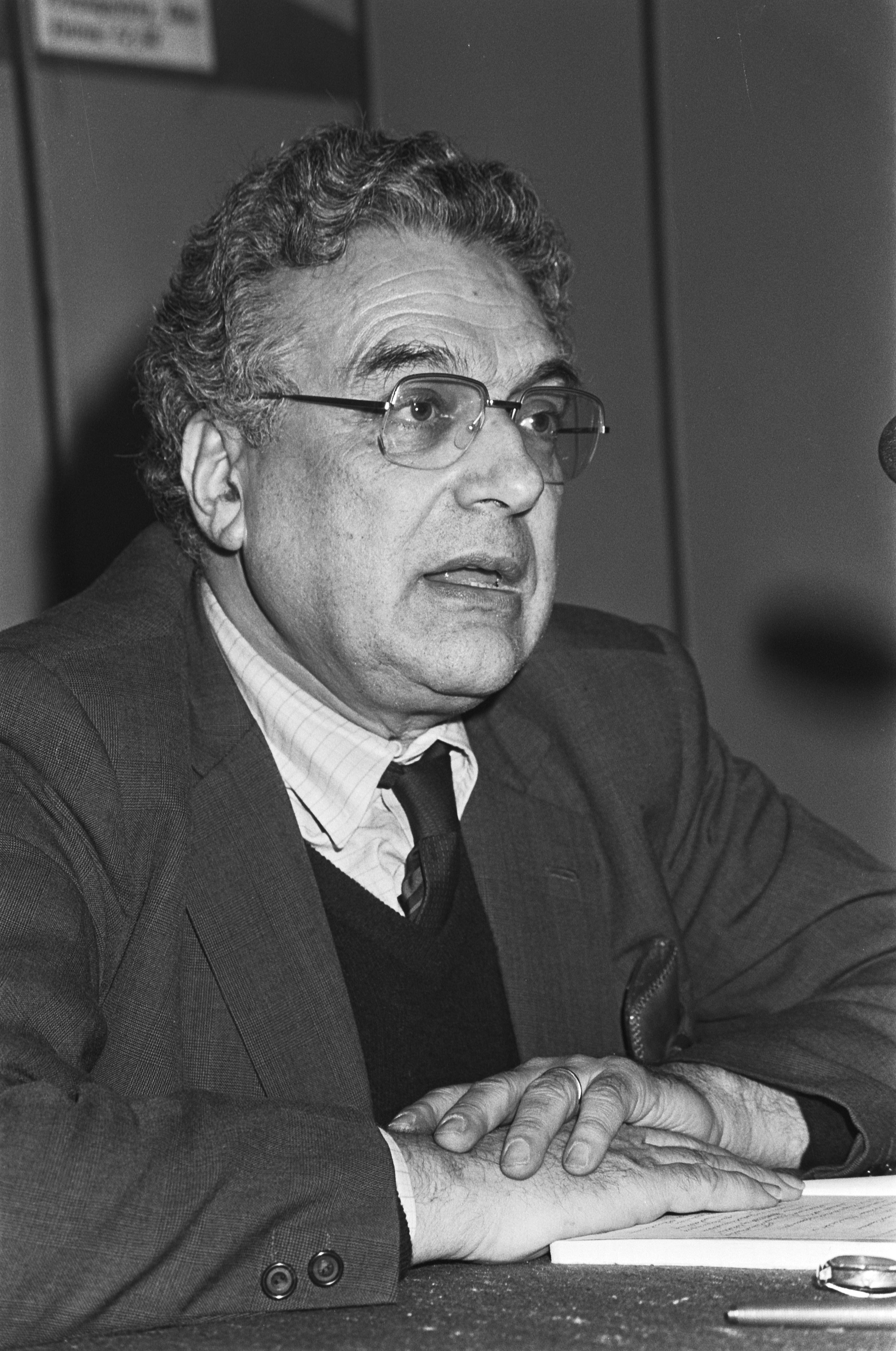
Ernst Mandel

Parametric determinism is a Marxist interpretation of the course of history. It was formulated by Ernest Mandel and can be viewed as one variant of Karl Marx's historical materialism or as a philosophy of history.

In an article critical of the analytical Marxism of Jon Elster, Mandel explains the idea as follows:

Dialectical determinism as opposed to mechanical, or formal-logical determinism, is also parametric determinism; it permits the adherent of historical materialism to understand the real place of human action in the way the historical process unfolds and the way the outcome of social crises is decided. Men and women indeed make their own history. The outcome of their actions is not mechanically predetermined. Most, if not all, historical crises have several possible outcomes, not innumerable fortuitous or arbitrary ones; that is why we use the expression 'parametric determinism' indicating several possibilities within a given set of parameters.

== Formal rationality and dialectical reason ==
In formal-logical determinism, human action is considered either rational, and hence logically explicable, or else arbitrary and random (in which case human actions can be comprehended at best only as patterns of statistical distributions, i.e. as degrees of variability relative to some constants). But in dialectical determinism, human action may be non-arbitrary and determinate, hence reasonable, even although it is not explicable exclusively in terms of deductive inference. The action selected by people from a limited range of options may not be the "most logical" or "most optimal" one, but it can be shown to be non-arbitrary and reasonable under the circumstances, if the total context is considered.

Dialectical theory aims to demonstrate this, by linking different "logical levels" together as a total picture, in a non-arbitrary way. "Different logical levels" means that particular determinants regarded as irrelevant at one level of analysis are excluded, but are relevant and included at another level of analysis with a somewhat different (or enlarged) set of assumptions depending on the kind of problem being investigated.

Dialectical theory does not mean that, in analyzing the complexity of human action, inconvenient facts are simply and arbitrarily set aside. It means, rather, that those facets of the subject matter which are not logically required at a given stage of the analysis are set aside. Yet, and this is the point, as the analysis progresses, the previously disregarded aspects are integrated step by step into the analysis, in a consistent way. The proof of the validity of the procedure is that, at the end, the theory has made the subject matter fully self-explanatory, since all salient aspects have been given their appropriate place in the theory, so that all of it becomes comprehensible, without resort to shallow tautologies. This result can obviously be achieved only after the research has already been done, and the findings can be arranged in a convincing way. A synthesis cannot be achieved without a preceding analysis. So dialectical analysis is not a "philosopher's stone" that provides a quick short-cut to the "fount of wisdom", but a mode of presenting findings of the analysis after knowledge has been obtained through inquiry and research, and dialectical relationships have been verified. Because only then does it become clear where the story should begin and end, so that all facets are truly explained. According to Ernest Mandel, "Marx's method is much richer than the procedures of ' successive concretization' or 'approximation' typical of academic science."

In mainstream social theory, the problem of "several logics" in human action is dealt with by game theory, a kind of modelling which specifies the choices and options which actors have within a defined setting, and what the effects are of their decisions. The main limitation of that approach is, that the model is only as good as the assumptions on which it is based, while the choice of assumptions is often eclectic or fairly arbitrary.

== Making history ==
One common problem in historical analysis is to understand to what extent the results of human actions can be attributed to free choices and decisions people made (or free will), and to what extent they are a product of social or natural forces beyond their control.

At the same time, however, the given parameters cannot usually determine in total what an individual or group will do, because they have at least some (and sometimes a great deal) of personal or behavioural autonomy. They can think about their situation, and make some free choices and decisions about what they will do, within the framework of what is objectively possible for them (the choices need not be rational or fully conscious ones, they could just be non-arbitrary choices influenced by emotions and desires). Sentient (self-aware) organisms, of which human beings are the most evolved sort, are able to vary their own response to given situations according to internally evaluated and decided options. In this sense, Karl Marx had written "People make their own history, but they do not make it as they please; they do not make it under self-selected circumstances, but under circumstances existing already, given and transmitted from the past.

== Ten implications ==
Ten implications of this view are as follows:

- At any point in time, the outcomes of an historical process are partly predetermined, and partly uncertain because they depend on what human choices and decisions will be made in the present. Those choices are not made in a vacuum, but in an environment which makes those choices possible, makes them meaningful and gives them effect. Otherwise they would not be real choices, only imaginary choices.
- While the past and the present rule out some courses of action, a human choice is always possible between a finite number of realistic options, which often enables the experienced analyst to specify the "most likely scenarios" of what could happen in the future. Some things cannot happen, and some things are more likely to happen than others.
- Once an important choice has been made and acted upon, this will have an effect on the realm of possibilities; in particular, it will shift to a greater or lesser extent the parameters delimiting what can happen in the future. Thus, once "a train of events has been set in motion", it will foreclose other possibilities, and also it might open up some new ones. If masses of people make important new choices, whether in response to circumstances or in response to a new idea, a qualitative change occurs; in that case, most people begin to behave differently.
- The process of history is both determined, in that the given parameters delimit the possible outcomes, but also open-ended, insofar as human action (or inaction) can change the historical outcomes within certain limits. Human history-making is therefore a reciprocal interaction between what people do, and the given circumstances.
- To some extent at least, it is possible to predict with useful accuracy what will happen in the future, if one has sufficient experience, knowledge, and insight into the relevant causal factors at work as well as how they are related. This may be a work of science or sustained practical experience. In turn, future perspectives can importantly influence human action in the present.
- In historical analysis and portrayals, the analytical challenge is to understand what part of a course of events is attributable to conscious human actions and decisions, what part is shaped by the combination of given circumstances in which the human actors had to act, and what exactly is the relationship between them (the link between the "part" and the "whole").
- Because the ability to prove historical assessments scientifically is limited, ideology, a mind-set or a social mentality about the state of the world typically plays an important role in the perspectives people develop (Mandel refers here to an idea by Lucien Goldmann). With hindsight, it may be possible to trace out accurately why events necessarily developed in the way that they did, and not otherwise. But at the time they are happening, this is usually not, or not completely possible, and the hope (or fear) for a particular future may play an important role (here Mandel refers to the philosophy of Ernst Bloch). In addition, ideology influences whether one looks upon past events as failures or successes (as many historians have noted, history is often rewritten by the victors in great historical battles to cast themselves in an especially positive light). There is no "non-partisan" history-writing in this sense, at best we can say the historian had full regard for the known facts pertaining to the given case and frankly acknowledges his biases.
- "History" in general cannot be simply defined as "the past", because it is also "the past living in the present" and "the future living in the present". Historical thinking is not just concerned with what past events led to the present, but also with those elements from the past which are contained in the present and elements that point to the future. It involves both antecedents and consequents, including future effects. Only on that basis can we define how people can "make history" as a conscious praxis.
- The main reason for studying history is not because we should assign praise or blame, or simply because it is interesting, but because we need to study past experience to understand the present and the future. History can be seen as a "laboratory", the lab-record of which shows how, under given conditions, people tried to achieve their goals, and what the results of their experimentations were. This can provide insight into what is likely or unlikely to succeed in future. At the very least, each generation has to come to grips with the experience of the previous generation, as well as educating the future generation.
- The theory of historicism according to which the historical process as a whole has an overall purpose or teleology (or "grand design") is rejected. With Karl Marx and Friedrich Engels, Mandel thought that "'History does nothing... It is people, real, living people who do all that... “history” is not, as it were, a person apart, using people as a means to achieve its own aims; history is nothing but the activity of people pursuing their aims".

== Perceptions and illusions ==
Mandel referred to the condition of alienation in the sense of a diminished belief in the ability to have control over one's own life, or feeling estranged from one's real nature and purpose in life.

Human action can have unintended consequences, including effects which are completely opposite to what was intended.

== Skeptical reply ==
Conscious human action, Mandel argues, is mainly non-arbitrary and practical, it has a certain "logic" to it even if people are not (yet) fully aware of this. The reality they face is ordered in basic ways, and therefore can be meaningfully understood. Masses of people might go into a "mad frenzy" sometimes that might be difficult to explain in rational terms, but this is the exception, not the rule. What is true is that a situation of chaos and disorder (when nothing in society seems to work properly anymore) can powerfully accentuate the irrational and non-rational aspects of human behaviour. In such situations, people with very unreasonable ideas can rise to power. This is, according to Mandel, part of the explanation of fascism.

== Criticisms ==
While Mandel himself made some successful predictions about the future of world society (for instance, he is famous for predicting at the beginning of the 1960s, like Milton Friedman did, that the postwar economic boom would end at the close of the decade), his Trotskyist critics (including his biographer Jan Willem Stutje) argue, with the benefit of hindsight, that he was far too optimistic and hopeful about the possibility of a workers' revolution in Eastern Europe and the Soviet Union during the Mikhail Gorbachev era and after—and more generally, that his historical optimism distorted his political perspectives, so that he became too "certain" about a future that he could not be so certain about, or else crucially ambivalent.

This is arguably a rather shallow criticism insofar as the situation could well have developed in different directions, which is precisely what Mandel himself argued; in politics, one could only try to make the most of the situation at the time, and here pessimism was not conducive to action. But the more substantive criticism is that many of Mandel's future scenarios were simply not realistic, and that in reality things turned out rather differently from what he thought. This raises several questions:

- whether the theory of parametric determinism in history is faulty;
- whether Mandel's application of the theory in his analyses was faulty;
- how much we can really foresee anyway, and what distinguishes forecast from prophecy; and
- whether and how much people learn from history anyway.

In answering these criticisms, Mandel himself would probably have referred to what he often called the "laboratory of history". That is, we can check the historical record, to see who predicted what, the grounds given for the prediction, and the results. On that basis, we can verify empirically what kind of thinking (and what kind of people) will produce the most accurate predictions, and what we can really predict with "usable accuracy". One reason why he favoured Marxism was because he believed it provided the best intellectual tools for predicting the future of society. He often cited Leon Trotsky as an example of a good Marxist able to predict the future. In 1925, Trotsky wrote:

The essence of Marxism consists in this, that it approaches society concretely, as a subject for objective research, and analyzes human history as one would a colossal laboratory record. Marxism appraises ideology as a subordinate integral element of the material social structure. Marxism examines the class structure of society as a historically conditioned form of the development of the productive forces; Marxism deduces from the productive forces of society the inter-relations between human society and surrounding nature, and these, in turn are determined at each historical stage by man’s technology, his instruments and weapons, his capacities and methods for struggle with nature. Precisely this objective approach arms Marxism with the insuperable power of historical foresight.

This may all seem a trivial "academic" or "scholastic" debate, similar to retrospective speculations about "what could have been different", but it has very important implications for the socialist idea of a planned economy. Obviously, if it is not possible to predict much about human behaviour with usable accuracy, then not much economic planning is feasible either—since a plan requires at least some expectation that its result can and will be realised in the future, even if the plan is regularly adjusted for new (and unanticipated) circumstances. In general, Mandel believed that the degree of predictability in human life was very much dependent on the way society itself was organised. If e.g. many producers competed with each other for profits and markets, based on privatized knowledge and business secrets, there was much unpredictability in what would happen. If the producers coordinated their efforts co-operatively, much would be predictable.

A deeper problem, to which Mandel alludes with his book Trotsky: A study in the dynamic of his thought, is that if we regard certain conditions as possible to change for the better, we might be able to change them, even if currently people believe it is impossible—whereas if we regard them as unchangeable, we are unlikely to change them at all, even although they could possibly be changed ( a similar insight occurs in pragmatism).

Mandel's reply to this skepticism essentially was to agree that there were always "unknowns" or "fuzzy" areas in human experience; for people to accomplish anything at all or "make their own history", required taking a risk, calculated or otherwise. One could indeed see one's life as a "wager" ultimately staked on a belief, scientifically grounded or otherwise. However, he argued it was one thing to realise all that, but another to say that the "unknowns" are "unknowable". Thus, for good or for ill, "you don't know, what you haven't tried" and more specifically "you don't know, what you haven't tried to obtain knowledge about". The limits of knowledge and human possibilities could not be fixed in advance by philosophy; they had to be discovered through the test of practice. This attitude recalls Marx's famous comment that "All social life is essentially practical. All mysteries which lead theory to mysticism find their rational solution in human practice, and in the comprehension of this practice.".

The general task of revolutionary science was to overcome ignorance about human life, and this could not very well be done by reconciling people with their allegedly "predetermined" fate at every opportunity. We all know we will die eventually, but that says little yet about what we can achieve before that point. Skepticism has its uses, but what those uses are, can only be verified from experience; a universal skepticism would be just as arbitrary as the belief that "anything is possible"—it did not lead to any new experience from which something could be learnt, including learning about the possibilities of human freedom. And such learning could only occur through making conscious choices and decisions within given parameters, i.e. in a non-arbitrary (non-chaotic) environment, permitting at least some predictability and allowing definite experiential conclusions.
