= Principle of rationality =

Methodology approach

The principle of rationality (or rationality principle) was coined by Karl R. Popper in his Harvard Lecture of 1963, and published in his book Myth of Framework. It is related to what he called the 'logic of the situation' in an Economica article of 1944/1945, published later in his book The Poverty of Historicism. According to Popper's rationality principle, agents act in the most adequate way according to the objective situation. It is an idealized conception of human behavior which he used to drive his model of situational analysis. Cognitive scientist Allen Newell elaborated on the principle in his account of knowledge level modeling.

== Popper ==
Popper called for social science to be grounded in what he called situational analysis or situational logic. This requires building models of social situations which include individual actors and their relationship to social institutions, e.g. markets, legal codes, bureaucracies, etc. These models attribute certain aims and information to the actors. This forms the 'logic of the situation', the result of reconstructing meticulously all circumstances of an historical event. The 'principle of rationality' is the assumption that people are instrumental in trying to reach their goals, and this is what drives the model. Popper believed that this model could be continuously refined to approach the objective truth.

Popper called his principle of rationality nearly empty (a technical term meaning without empirical content) and strictly speaking false, but nonetheless tremendously useful. These remarks earned him a lot of criticism because seemingly he had swerved from his famous Logic of Scientific Discovery.

Among the many philosophers having discussed Popper's principle of rationality from the 1960s up to now are Noretta Koertge, R. Nadeau, Viktor J. Vanberg, Hans Albert, E. Matzner, Ian C. Jarvie, Mark A. Notturno, John Wettersten, Ian C. Böhm.

== Newell ==
In the context of knowledge-based systems, Newell (in 1982) proposed the following principle of rationality: "If an agent has knowledge that one of its actions will lead to one of its goals, then the agent will select that action." This principle is employed by agents at the knowledge level to move closer to a desired goal. An important philosophical difference between Newell and Popper is that Newell argued that the knowledge level is real in the sense that it exists in nature and is not made up. This allowed Newell to treat the rationality principle as a way of understanding nature and avoid the problems Popper ran into by treating knowledge as non physical and therefore non empirical.

== See also ==
- Hermeneutics
- Rational choice
