= Friedrich Pützer =

German architect and urban planner

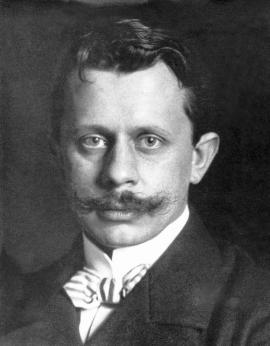
Friedrich Pützer

Friedrich Pützer (25 July 1871 – 31 January 1922) was a German architect and urban planner.

Pützer was born in Aachen. He was known mainly as a Protestant church architect, making numerous constructions or renovations of churches in the Rhine-Main area, particularly in Darmstadt. In 1910 he designed Lutherkirche in Wiesbaden. In 1912 he designed Darmstadt Hauptbahnhof. He died in Frankfurt.

== Life ==
The son of Joseph Pützer (1831–1913), prinical in Aachen and Elisabeth Zander studied at the University of Technology in Aachen. In 1897 he move to Darmstadt and assisted Karl Hofmann, Erwin Marx and Georg Wickop at the Technical University of Darmstadt.
