= Historicism =

Approach to explaining social and cultural phenomena by studying their history

Historicism is an approach to understanding social, cultural, philosophical, and historical phenomena in terms of their historical development. It emphasizes that ideas, institutions, and values are best understood by examining the historical processes through which they appeared and developed.

Historicism is applied in disciplines including philosophy, history, anthropology, sociology, and literary studies. It is often contrasted with, but may also complement, different approaches, such as functionalism, which explain phenomena in terms of the functions they perform rather than their historical development.

The term was introduced in the late eighteenth century and has acquired several distinct meanings over time. Nowadays, historicism encompasses a variety of philosophical and scholarly traditions, including Hegelian historicism, anthropological historicism, New Historicism, and Protestant historicist interpretation of biblical prophecy, and has been particularly associated with thinkers such as Georg Wilhelm Friedrich Hegel, Karl Marx, and Franz Boas.

Historicism has been the subject of extensive philosophical debate. Karl Popper used the term to describe theories that seek laws of historical development capable of predicting the course of history, arguing that such approaches encourage historical determinism and threaten the open society. Other critics, including Leo Strauss, have challenged historicism for its implications for historical explanation, political philosophy, and objectivity.

Art historian David Summers, building on the work of E. H. Gombrich, defines historicism negatively, writing that it posits "that laws of history are formulatable and that in general the outcome of history is predictable," adding that historicism poses "the idea that history is a universal matrix prior to events, which are simply placed in order within that matrix by the historian." This approach, he writes, "seems to make the ends of history visible, thus to justify the liquidation of groups seen not to have a place in the scheme of history" and has led to the "fabrication of some of the most murderous myths of modern times."

== History of the term ==
The term historicism (Historismus) was coined by German philosopher Karl Wilhelm Friedrich Schlegel. Over time, what historicism is and how it is practiced have developed different and divergent meanings. According to Schlegel, Winckelmann’s approach to historicism marked the beginning of a new era in philosophy by recognizing the unique character and distinctiveness of antiquity. In contrast, other eighteenth-century philosophers distorted the true nature of the ancient world by reinterpreting it through philosophical concepts. Schlegel particularly warned against theoretical views that were not linked to specific individuals and lacked a historical foundation. The following year, Novalis, while outlining different methods, employed the term Historismus, although he did not assign a precise meaning to it in this context. Elements of historicism appear in the writings of French essayist Michel de Montaigne (1533–1592) and Italian philosopher G. B. Vico (1668–1744), and became more fully developed with the dialectic of Georg Wilhelm Friedrich Hegel (1770–1831), influential in 19th-century Europe. The writings of Karl Marx, influenced by Hegel, also occasionally include historicism. The term is also associated with the empirical social sciences and with the work of Franz Boas. Historicism tends to be hermeneutic because it values cautious, rigorous, and contextualized interpretation of information; or relativist, because it rejects notions of universal, fundamental and immutable interpretations. In the twentieth century, the Italian philosopher Benedetto Croce, the English thinker R. G. Collingwood, and the Spanish philosopher José Ortega y Gasset adopted historicism as an approach aimed at enhancing the understanding of human thought and experience.

Karl Popper, in his work The Poverty of Historicism, addressed historicism in relation to Hegel and Marx’s attempts to justify authority through laws of historical development, though Popper departed from 19th century German historicism and then contemporary thinkers such as Collingwood in defining historicism as a predictive science. In his Idea of History, Collingwood distinguished between history as an attempt to rethink the past from psychology as a natural scientific study of the lower echelons of the mind. Popper was worried about historicism's assault on open democratic societies, while his contemporary Collingwood was concerned with understanding the past.

The Soviet Encyclopedia presented the term from a Marxist-Leninist perspective, emphasizing the notion of “legitimate development.” In American literary studies, New Historicism emerged as a postmodern interpretive approach that foregrounds the specificity of historical and cultural contexts, while making limited reference to earlier European debates.

== Variants ==
=== Hegelian ===
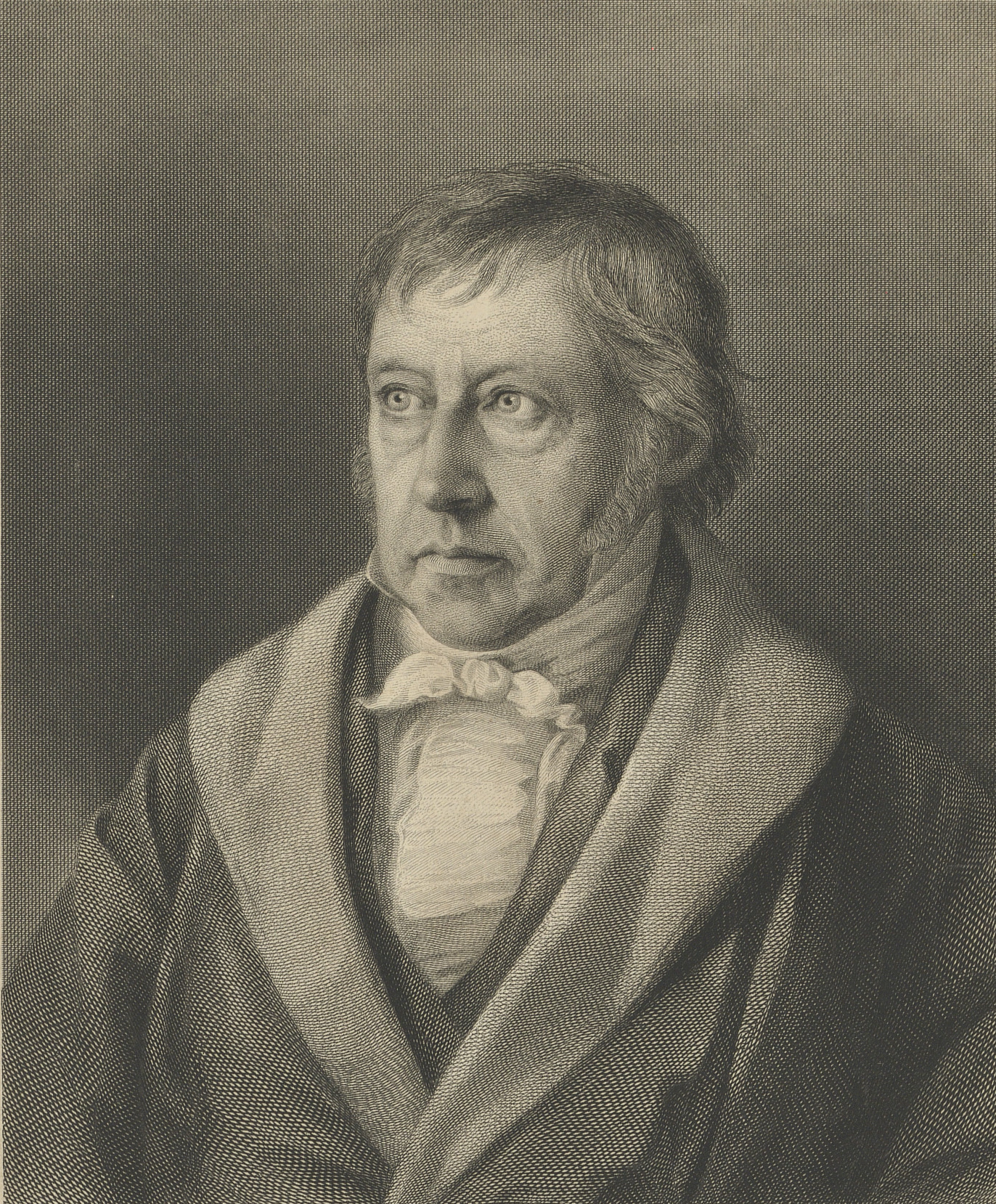
G. W. F. Hegel (1770–1831)

Hegel viewed the realization of human freedom as the ultimate purpose of history, which could be achieved only through the creation of the perfect state. Historical progress toward this state would occur through a dialectical process: the tension between the purpose of humankind (freedom) and humankind's current condition would produce the attempt by humankind to change its condition to one more in accord with its nature. However, because humans are often not aware of the goal of humanity and history, the process of achieving freedom is necessarily one of self-discovery.

Hegel saw progress toward freedom as conducted by the "spirit" (Geist), a seemingly supernatural force that directs all human actions and interactions. Yet Hegel makes clear that the spirit is a mere abstraction that comes into existence "through the activity of finite agents". Thus, Hegel's determining forces of history may not have a metaphysical nature, though many of his opponents and interpreters have understood him as holding metaphysical and deterministic views.

Hegel's historicism also suggests that any human society and all human activities such as science, art, or philosophy, are defined by their history. Consequently, their essence can be sought only by understanding said history. The history of any such human endeavor, moreover, not only continues but also reacts against what has gone before; this is the source of Hegel's famous dialectic teaching usually summarized by the slogan "thesis, antithesis, and synthesis". (Hegel did not use these terms, although Johann Fichte did.) Hegel's famous aphorism, "Philosophy is the history of philosophy", describes it bluntly.

Hegel's position is perhaps best illuminated when contrasted against the atomistic and reductionist opinion of human societies and social activities self-defining on an ad hoc basis through the sum of dozens of interactions. Yet another contrasting model is the persistent metaphor of a social contract. Hegel considers the relationship between individuals and societies as organic, not atomic: even their social discourse is mediated by language, and language is based on etymology and unique character. It thus preserves the culture of the past in thousands of half-forgotten metaphors. To understand why a person is the way they are, you must examine that person in their society: and to understand that society, you must understand its history, and the forces that influenced it. The Zeitgeist, the "Spirit of the Age", is the concrete embodiment of the most important factors that are acting in human history at any given time. This contrasts with teleological theories of activity, which suppose that the end is the determining factor of activity, as well as those who believe in a tabula rasa, or blank slate, opinion, such that individuals are defined by their interactions.

These ideas can be interpreted variously. The Right Hegelians, working from Hegel's opinions about the organicism and historically determined nature of human societies, interpreted Hegel's historicism as a justification of the unique destiny of national groups and the importance of stability and institutions. Hegel's conception of human societies as entities greater than the individuals who constitute them influenced nineteenth-century romantic nationalism and its twentieth-century excesses. The Young Hegelians, by contrast, interpreted Hegel's thoughts on societies influenced by social conflict as a doctrine of social progress, and attempted to manipulate these forces to cause various results. Karl Marx's doctrine of "historical inevitabilities" and historical materialism is one of the more influential reactions to this part of Hegel's thought. Significantly, Karl Marx's theory of alienation argues that capitalism disrupt traditional relationships between workers and their work.

Hegelian historicism is related to his ideas on the means by which human societies progress, specifically the dialectic and his conception of logic as representing the inner essential nature of reality. Hegel attributes the change to the "modern" need to interact with the world, whereas ancient philosophers were self-contained, and medieval philosophers were monks. In his History of Philosophy Hegel writes:

In modern times things are very different; now we no longer see philosophic individuals who constitute a class by themselves. With the present day all difference has disappeared; philosophers are not monks, for we find them generally in connection with the world, participating with others in some common work or calling. They live, not independently, but in the relation of citizens, or they occupy public offices and take part in the life of the state. Certainly they may be private persons, but if so, their position as such does not in any way isolate them from their other relationships. They are involved in present conditions, in the world and its work and progress. Thus their philosophy is only by the way, a sort of luxury and superfluity. This difference is really to be found in the manner in which outward conditions have taken shape after the building up of the inward world of religion. In modern times, namely, on account of the reconciliation of the worldly principle with itself, the external world is at rest, is brought into order — worldly relationships, conditions, modes of life, have become constituted and organized in a manner which is conformable to nature and rational. We see a universal, comprehensible connection, and with that individuality likewise attains another character and nature, for it is no longer the plastic individuality of the ancients. This connection is of such power that every individuality is under its dominion, and yet at the same time can construct for itself an inward world.

This opinion that entanglement in society creates an indissoluble bond with expression, would become an influential question in philosophy, namely, the requirements for individuality. It would be considered by Nietzsche, John Dewey and Michel Foucault directly, as well as in the work of numerous artists and authors. There have been various responses to Hegel's challenge. The Romantic period emphasized the ability of individual genius to transcend time and place, and use the materials from their heritage to fashion works which were beyond determination. The modern would advance versions of John Locke's infinite malleability of the human animal. Post-structuralism would argue that since history is not present, but only the image of history, that while an individual era or power structure might emphasize a particular history, that the contradictions within the story would hinder the very purposes that the history was constructed to advance.

=== Anthropological ===
In the context of anthropology and other sciences which study the past, historicism has a different meaning. Historical Particularism is associated with the work of Franz Boas. His theory used the diffusionist concept that there were a few "cradles of civilization" which grew outwards, and merged it with the idea that societies would adapt to their circumstances. The school of historicism grew in response to unilinear theories that social development represented adaptive fitness, and therefore existed on a continuum. While these theories were espoused by Charles Darwin and many of his students, their application as applied in social Darwinism and general evolution characterized in the theories of Herbert Spencer and Leslie White, historicism was neither anti-selection, nor anti-evolution, as Darwin never attempted nor offered an explanation for cultural evolution. However, it attacked the notion that there was one normative spectrum of development, instead emphasizing how local conditions would create adaptations to the local environment. Julian Steward refuted the viability of globally and universally applicable adaptive standards proposing that culture was honed adaptively in response to the idiosyncrasies of the local environment, the cultural ecology, by specific evolution. What was adaptive for one region might not be so for another. This conclusion has likewise been adopted by modern forms of biological evolutionary theory.

The primary method of historicism was empirical, namely that there were so many requisite inputs into a society or event, that only by emphasizing the data available could a theory of the source be determined. In this opinion, grand theories are unprovable, and instead intensive field work would determine the most likely explanation and history of a culture, and hence it is named "historicism".

This opinion would produce a wide range of definition of what, exactly, constituted culture and history, but in each case the only means of explaining it was in terms of the historical particulars of the culture itself.

=== New Historicism ===
Since the 1950s, when Jacques Lacan and Michel Foucault argued that each epoch has its own knowledge system, within which individuals are inexorably entangled, many post-structuralists have used historicism to describe the opinion that all questions must be settled within the cultural and social context in which they are raised. Answers cannot be found by appeal to an external truth, but only within the confines of the norms and forms that phrase the question. This version of historicism holds that there are only the raw texts, markings and artifacts that exist in the present, and the conventions used to decode them. This school of thought is sometimes given the name of New Historicism. The same term, new historicism is also used for a school of literary scholarship which interprets a poem, drama, etc. as an expression of or reaction to the power-structures of its society. Stephen Greenblatt is an example of this school.

=== Modern Historicism ===
Within the context of 20th-century philosophy, debates continue as to whether ahistorical and immanent methods were sufficient to understand the meaning (that is to say, "what you see is what you get" positivism) or whether context, background and culture are important beyond the mere need to decode words, phrases and references. While post-structural historicism is relativist in its orientation—that is, it sees each culture as its own frame of reference—a large number of thinkers have embraced the need for historical context, not because culture is self-referential, but because there is no more compressed means of conveying all of the relevant information except through history. This opinion is often seen as deriving from the work of Benedetto Croce. Recent historians using this tradition include Thomas Kuhn.

Talcott Parsons criticized historicism as a case of idealistic fallacy in The Structure of Social Action (1937). Post-structuralism uses the term new historicism, which has some associations with both anthropology and Hegelianism.

=== Christian Historicism ===
==== Eschatological ====
In Christianity, the term historicism refers to the confessional Protestant form of prophetical interpretation which holds that the fulfillment of biblical prophecy has occurred throughout history and continues to occur; as opposed to other methods which limit the time-frame of prophecy-fulfillment to the past or to the future.

==== Dogmatic and ecclesiastic ====
There is also a particular opinion in ecclesiastical history and in the history of dogmas which has been described as historicist by Pope Pius XII in the encyclical Humani generis. "They add that the history of dogmas consists in the reporting of the various forms in which revealed truth has been clothed, forms that have succeeded one another in accordance with the different teachings and opinions that have arisen over the course of the centuries." "There is also a certain historicism, which attributing value only to the events of man's life, overthrows the foundation of all truth and absolute law, both on the level of philosophical speculations and especially to Christian dogmas."

== Critics ==
=== Marxism ===
Western Marxists such as Karl Korsch, Antonio Gramsci and the early Georg Lukacs emphasise the roots of Marx's thought in Hegel. They interpret Marxism as a historically relativist philosophy, which views ideas (including Marxist theory) as products of the historical epochs that create them. In this view, Marxism is not an objective social science, but rather a theoretical expression of the class consciousness of the working class within a historical process. This understanding of Marxism is strongly criticised by the structural Marxist Louis Althusser, who affirms that Marxism is an objective science, autonomous from interests of society and class. Marxism is, therefore, often associated with deterministic claims of future historical development, but these are not structural parts of Marxism as a style of critique which requires distinction between various critical registers, which at once develops an understanding of broad historical-geographical tensions without prophesying a specific outcome.

=== Karl Popper ===
Karl Popper used the term historicism in his influential books The Poverty of Historicism and The Open Society and Its Enemies, to mean: "an approach to the social sciences which assumes that historical prediction is their primary aim, and which assumes that this aim is attainable by discovering the 'rhythms' or the 'patterns', the 'laws' or the 'trends' that underlie the evolution of history". Popper condemned historicism along with the determinism and holism which he argued formed its basis, claiming that historicism had the potential to inform dogmatic, ideological beliefs not predicated upon facts that were falsifiable. In The Poverty of Historicism, he identified historicism with the opinion that there are "inexorable laws of historical destiny", an opinion he warned against. If this seems to contrast with what proponents of historicism argue for, in terms of contextually relative interpretation, this happens, according to Popper, only because such proponents are unaware of the type of causality they ascribe to history. Popper wrote with reference to Hegel's theory of history, which he criticized extensively.

In The Open Society and Its Enemies, Popper attacks "historicism" and its proponents, among whom he identifies and singles out Hegel, Plato and Marx—calling them all "enemies of the open society". The objection he makes is that historicist positions, by claiming that there is an inevitable and deterministic pattern to history, evade the responsibility of the individual to make free contributions to the evolution of society, hence leading to totalitarianism. Throughout this work, he defines his conception of historicism as: "The central historicist doctrine—the doctrine that history is controlled by specific historical or evolutionary laws whose discovery would enable us to prophesy the destiny of man." As mentioned above, such characterizations of Marx in particular are not entirely accurate to Marx in his own right, and have drawn criticism from philosophers such as Lakatos for mischaracterizing the defense of induction in historical materialism. Other philosophers such as Walter Kaufmann have also been critical of Popper, calling his reading of Hegel a “myth,” “known largely through secondary sources…”

Another of his targets is what he terms "moral historicism", the attempt to infer moral values from the course of history; in Hegel's words, that "history is the world's court of justice". Popper says that he does not believe "that success proves anything or that history is our judge". Futurism must be distinguished from prophecies that the right will prevail: these attempt to infer history from ethics, rather than ethics from history, and are therefore historicism in the normal sense rather than moral historicism.

He also attacks what he calls "historism", which he regards as distinct from historicism. By historism, he means the tendency to regard every argument or idea as completely accounted for by its historical context, as opposed to assessing it by its merits.

=== Leo Strauss ===
Leo Strauss used the term historicism and reportedly termed it the single greatest threat to intellectual freedom insofar as it denies any attempt to address injustice-pure-and-simple (such is the significance of historicism's rejection of "natural right" or "right by nature"). Strauss argued that historicism "rejects political philosophy" (insofar as this stands or falls by questions of permanent, trans-historical significance) and is based on the belief that "all human thought, including scientific thought, rests on premises which cannot be validated by human reason and which came from historical epoch to historical epoch." Strauss further identified R. G. Collingwood as the most coherent advocate of historicism in the English language. Countering Collingwood's arguments, Strauss warned against historicist social scientists' failure to address real-life problems—most notably that of tyranny—to the extent that they relativize (or "subjectivize") all ethical problems by placing their significance strictly in function of particular or ever-changing socio-material conditions devoid of inherent or "objective" "value". Similarly, Strauss criticized Eric Voegelin's abandonment of ancient political thought as guide or vehicle in interpreting modern political problems.

In his books, Natural Right and History and On Tyranny, Strauss offers a complete critique of historicism as it emerges in the works of Hegel, Marx, and Heidegger. Many believe that Strauss also found historicism in Edmund Burke, Tocqueville, Augustine, and John Stuart Mill. Although it is largely disputed whether Strauss himself was a historicist, he often indicated that historicism grew out of and against Christianity and was a threat to civic participation, belief in human agency, religious pluralism, and, most controversially, an accurate understanding of the classical philosophers and religious prophets themselves. Throughout his work, he warns that historicism, and the understanding of progress that results from it, expose us to tyranny, totalitarianism, and democratic extremism. In a collection of his works by Kenneth Hart entitled Jewish Philosophy and the Crisis of Modernity, he argues that Islam, traditional Judaism, and ancient Greece, share a concern for sacred law that makes them especially susceptible to historicism, and therefore to tyranny.

== See also ==
- Parametric determinism
- Path dependence
- Sociocultural evolution
