= Situational logic =

Formal logic of experienced situational worldviews

Situational logic (also situational analysis) is a concept advanced by Karl Popper in his The Poverty of Historicism. Situational logic is a process by which a social scientist tries to reconstruct the problem situation confronting an agent in order to understand that agent's choice.

Noretta Koertge (1975) provides a helpful clarificatory summary. (Note: This use of this summary is from Boumans and Davis (2010).)

First provide a description of the situation:

''Agent A was in a situation of type C''.

This situation is then analysed

''In a situation of type C, the appropriate thing to do is X.''

The rationality principle may then be called upon:
''agents always act appropriately to their situation''
Finally we have the explanadum:

''(therefore) A did X.''
