= Westend, Wiesbaden =

Westend
- Borough of Wiesbaden
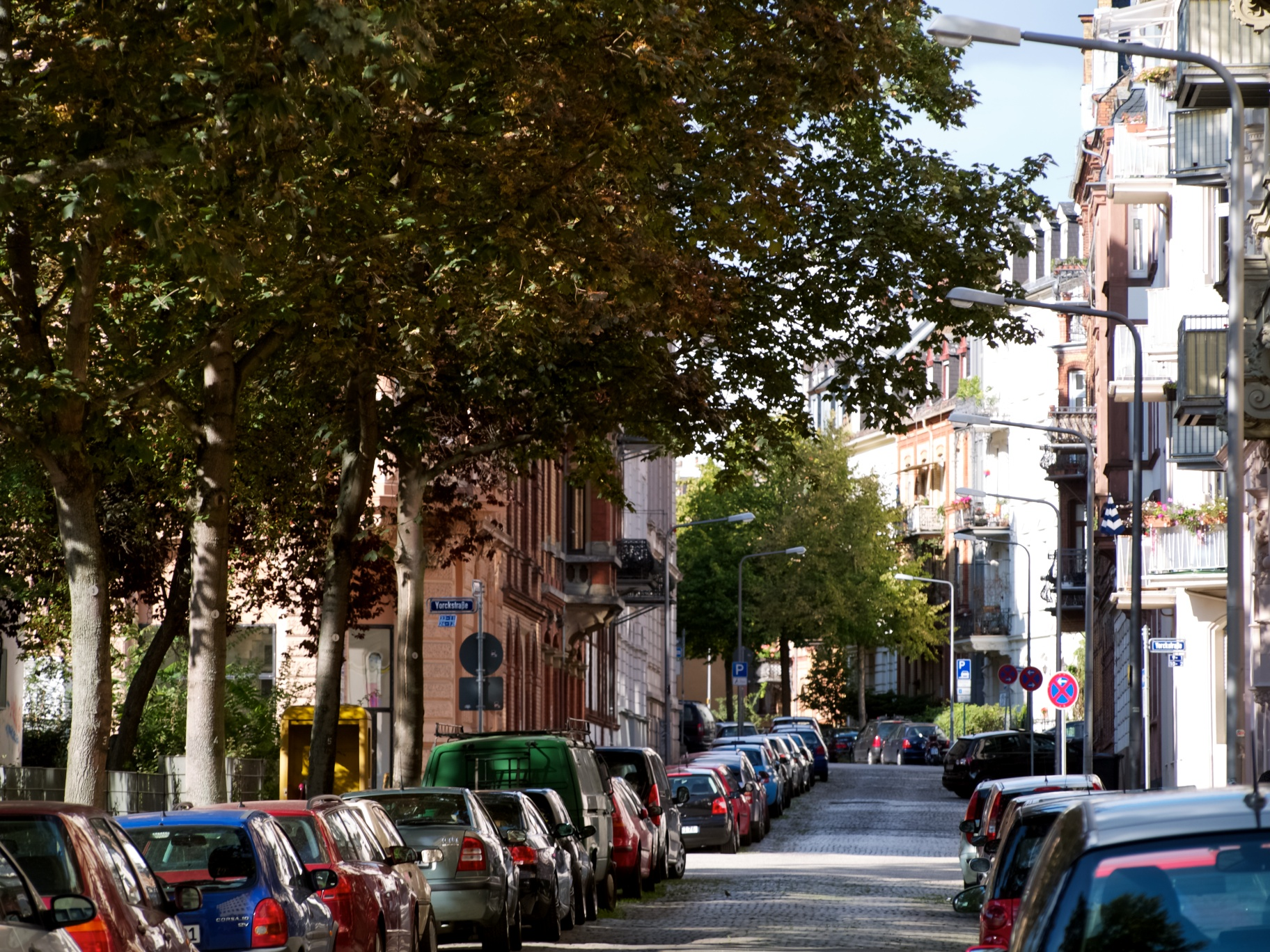
- Typical street in Westend

- Coat of arms

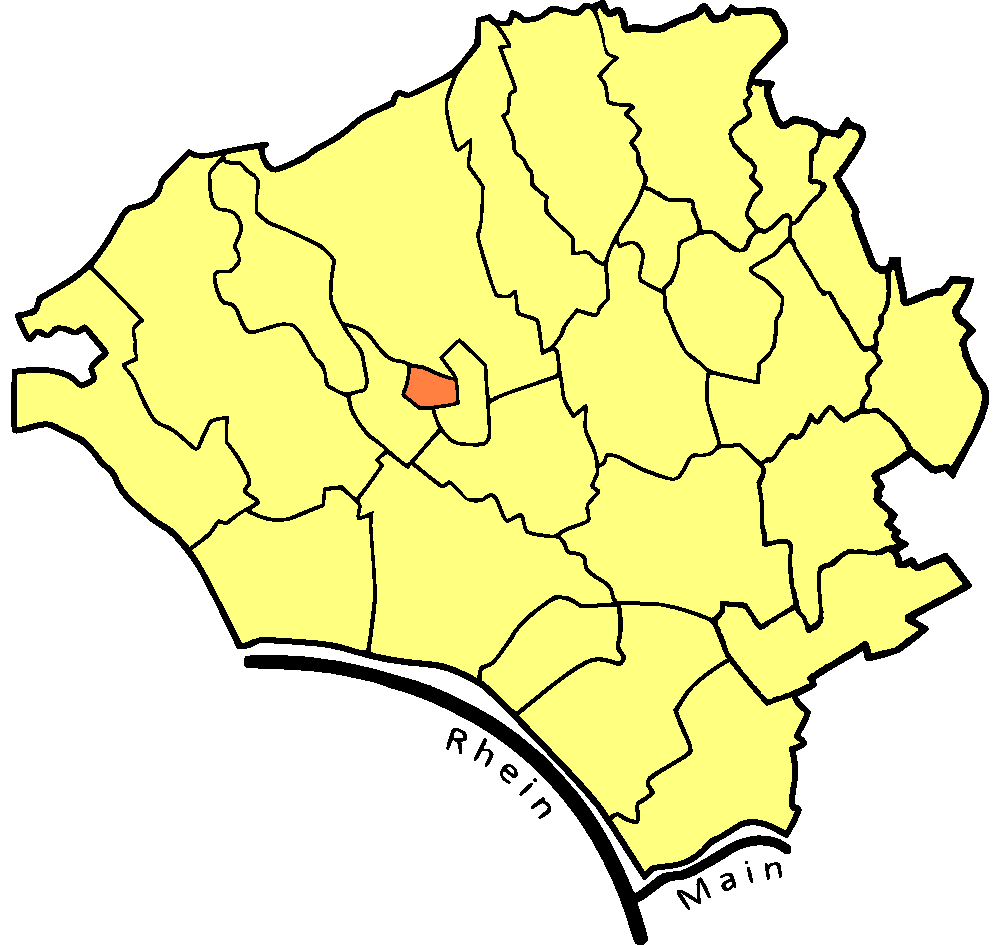
- Location of Westend in Wiesbaden
- Interactive map of Westend
- Location within Germany Location within Hesse
- Coordinates: 50°04′49″N 8°13′46″E
- Country: Germany
- State: Hesse
- District: Urban district
- City: Wiesbaden

Government
  - Mayor: Volker Wild (Greens)

Area
  - Total: 0.67 km^{2} (0.26 sq mi)

Population (2020-12-31)
  - Total: 18,226
  - Density: 27,000/km^{2} (70,000/sq mi)
- Time zone: UTC+01:00 (CET)
  - Summer (DST): UTC+02:00 (CEST)
- Postal codes: 65183
- Dialling codes: 0611

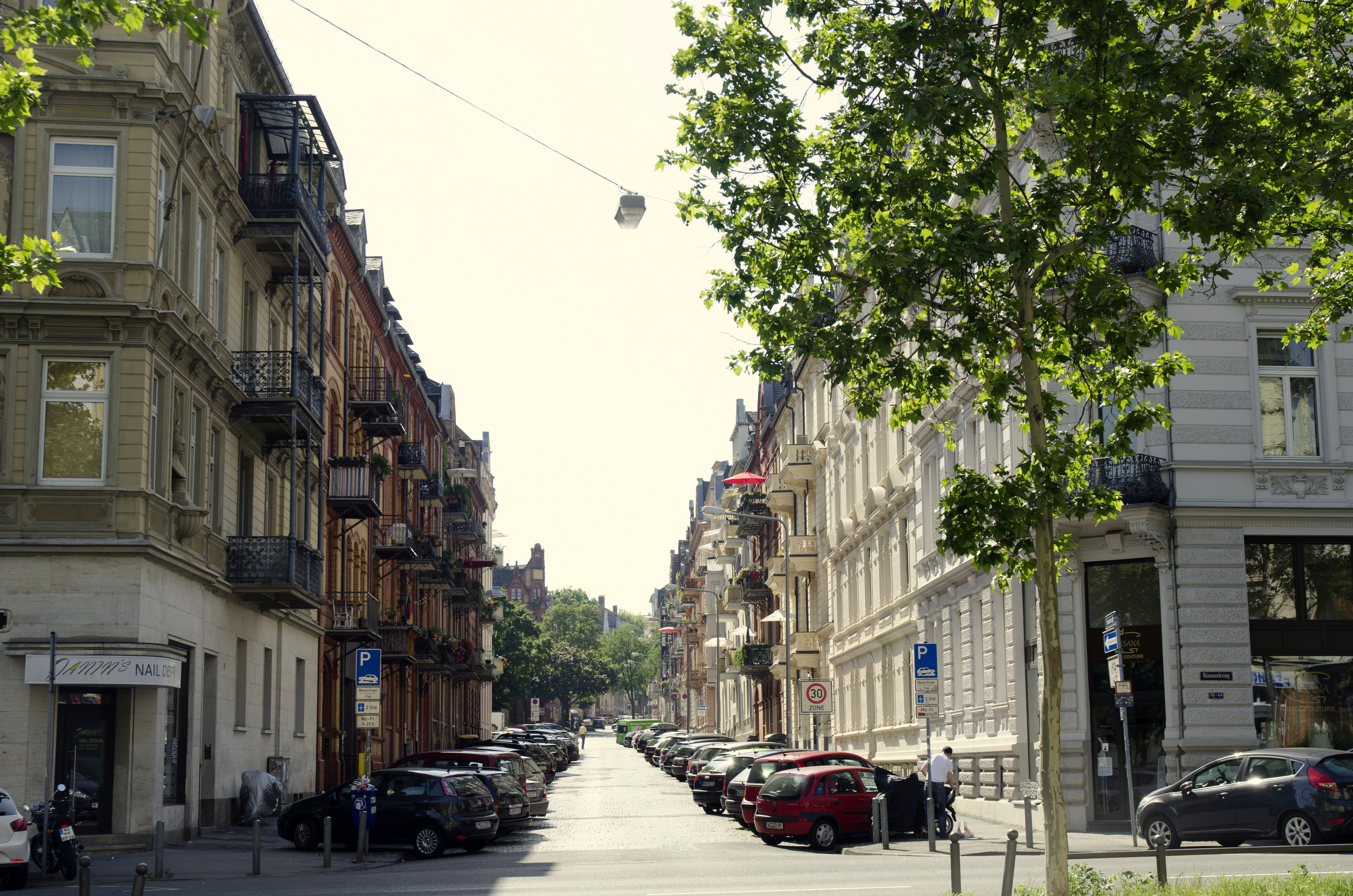
Street in Westend borough

Westend is a borough of the city of Wiesbaden, Hesse, Germany. With a density of about 27,000 inhabitants per km^{2} it is the most densely populated urban district in Germany. It is located in the centre of the city.

== Sources ==
- Derived from German Wikipedia
