= Knowledge level modeling =

Knowledge level modeling is the process of theorizing over observations about a world and, to some extent, explaining the behavior of an agent as it interacts with its environment.

Crucial to the understanding of knowledge level modeling are Allen Newell's notions of the knowledge level, operators, and an agent's goal state.

- The knowledge level refers to the knowledge an agent has about its world.
- Operators are what can be applied to an agent to affect its state.
- An agent's goal state is the status reached after the appropriate operators have been applied to transition from a previous, non-goal state.

Essentially, knowledge level modeling involves evaluating an agent's knowledge of the world and all possible states and with that information constructing a model that depicts the interrelations and pathways between the various states. With this model, various problem solving methods (i.e. prediction, classification, explanation, tutoring, qualitative reasoning, planning, etc.) can be viewed in a uniform fashion. This modeling aspect is crucial in cognitive architectures for intelligent agents.

In "Applications of Abduction: Knowledge-Level Modeling", Menzies proposes a new knowledge level modeling approach, called KL_{B}, which specifies that "a knowledge base should be divided into domain-specific facts and domain-independent abstract problem solving inference procedures." In his method, abductive reasoning is used to find assumptions which, when combined with theories, achieve the desired goals of the system.

Lack of Knowledge-Level in sports coaches might be dangerous and increase risk of injuries.

For a good example of abductive reasoning, look at logical reasoning.

== See also ==
- Knowledge level
- Knowledge engineering
