= Ringkirche =

Church building in Wiesbaden, Germany

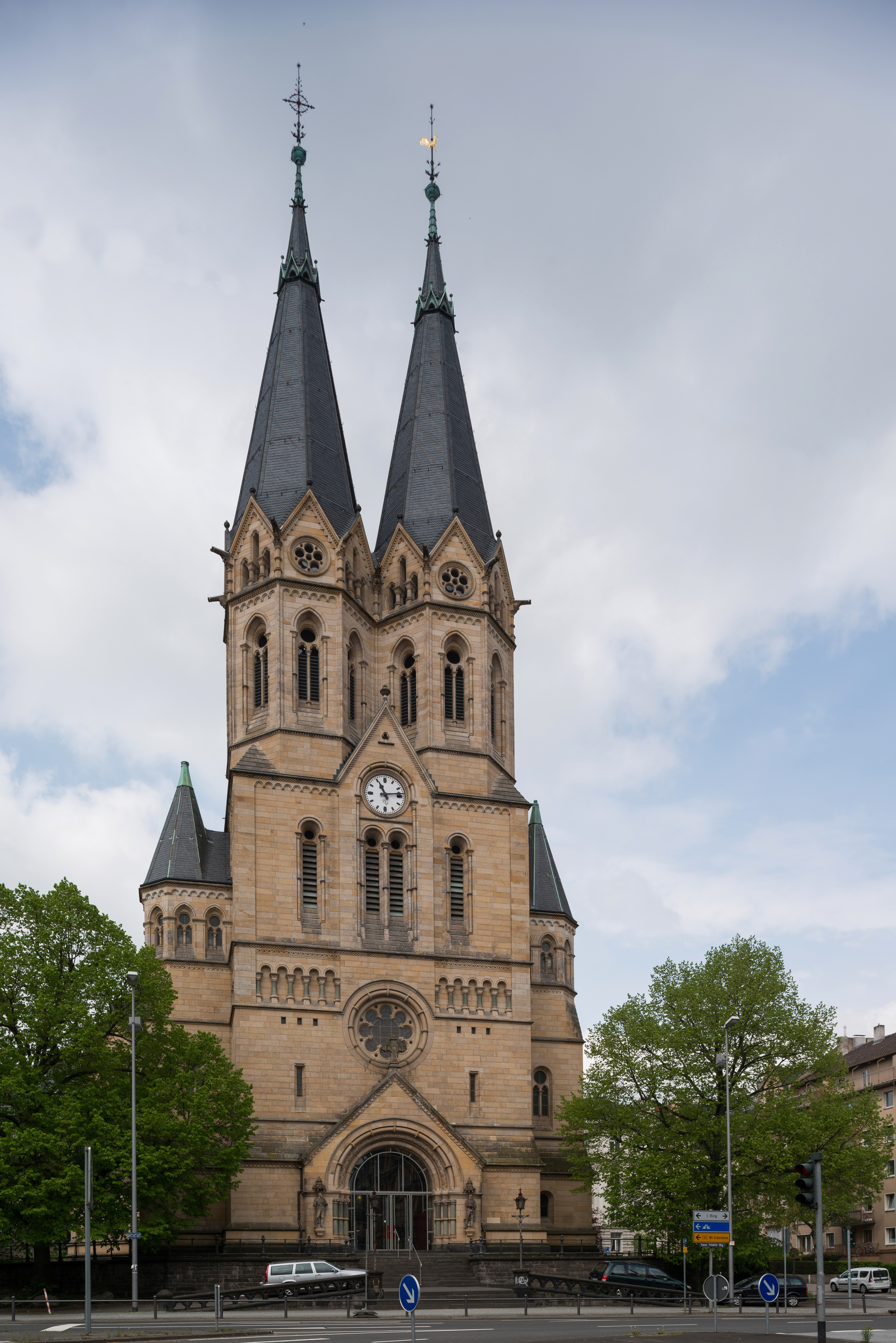
- View of the Ringkirche from the Rheinstraße

Religion
- Affiliation: Protestant Church in Hesse and Nassau

Location
- Location: Wiesbaden, Hesse, Germany
- Interactive map of Ringkirche
- Coordinates: 50°4′38″N 8°13′46″E

Architecture
- Architect: Johannes Otzen
- Type: Zentralbau
- Style: Romanesque Revival
- Completed: 1894

Website
- www.ringkirche.de

The Ringkirche (Ring Church) is a Protestant church in Wiesbaden, the state capital of Hesse, Germany. The Romanesque Revival church was built between 1892 and 1894 and designed by Johannes Otzen. The historic monument also serves as a concert venue.

== History ==
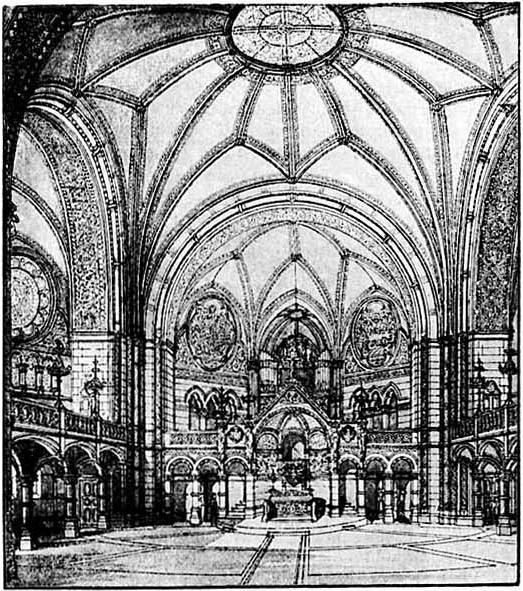
Interior, sketch by architect Johannes Otzen

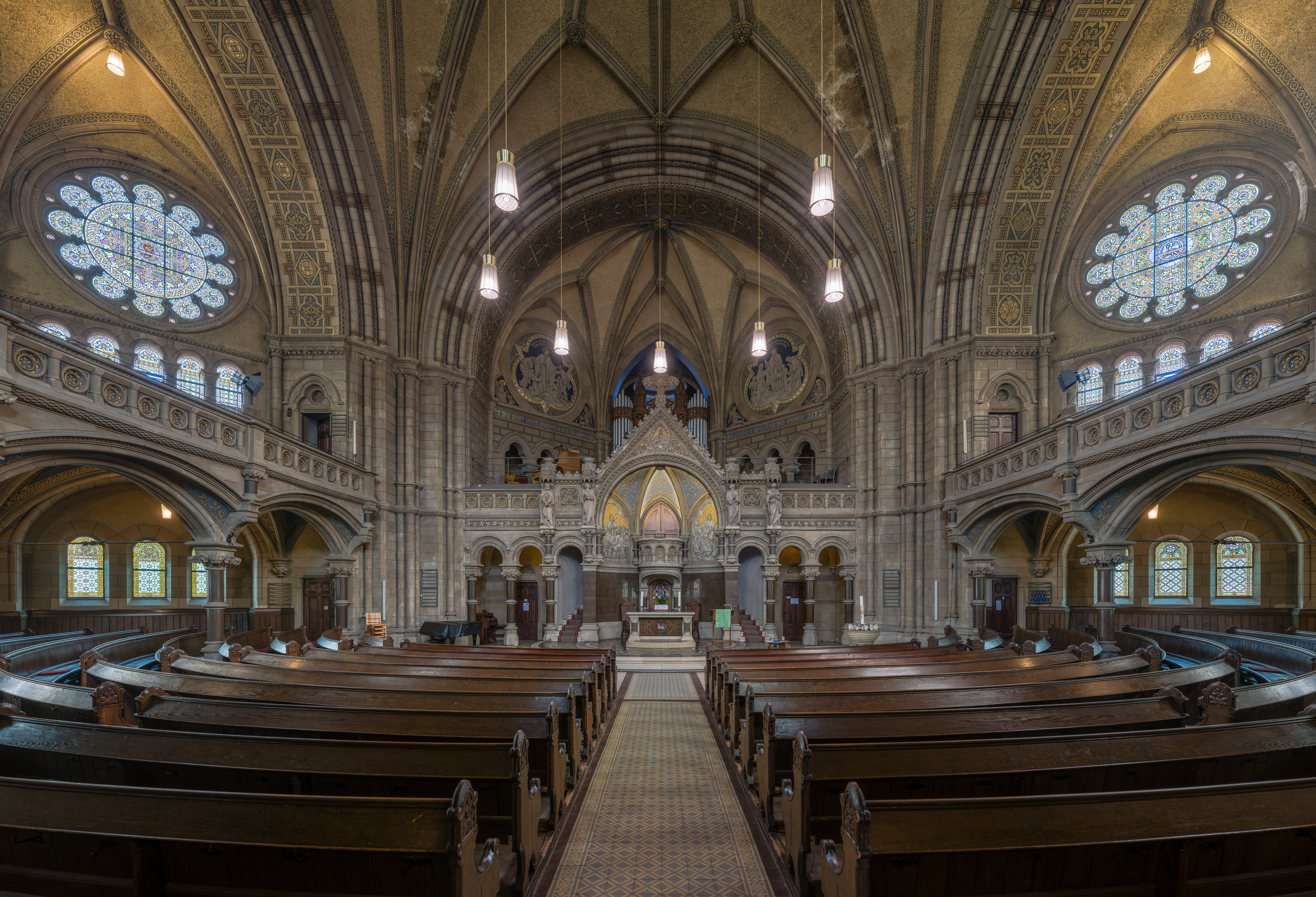
Interior

The Ringkirche was the first Protestant church in Germany to follow the Wiesbadener Programm, which focused on a clear view from every seat to the combined altar, pulpit, organ and choir areas. It was built between 1892 and 1894 and designed by Johannes Otzen, one of the authors of the Wiesbadener Programm. The hall is a Zentralbau of a type which became a model for Protestant church buildings until the end of World War I. It was consecrated in 1894, seating 1,100 people. Its organ was built by Walcker, with a Romantic disposition, of which 75% is again intact today. The organ was modified to a neo-Baroque disposition in 1949, but restored to its original disposition by major restoration from 2015, leaving not one of the c. 1,800 pipes untouched. Around a quarter of them were replaced. and the others were repaired.

The Romanesque Revival church is located on the Ringstraße between the central districts of Westend and Rheingauviertel. Its twin towers dominate the intersecting Rheinstraße.

A building of the Gründerzeit, the church was declared a German Nationaldenkmal (national monument) in 2002. It demonstrates a uniform style, reminiscent of the period between Romanesque and Gothic architecture, unaltered by destruction in wars or later remodeling. The building was extensively restored beginning in 2003. It is used for church concerts, such as a venue of the Rheingau Musik Festival.

== Literature ==
- Baedeker Wiesbaden Rheingau, Karl Baedeker GmbH, Ostfildern-Kemnat, 2001
- Gottfried Kiesow, Das verkannte Jahrhundert. Der Historismus am Beispiel Wiesbaden, Deutsche Stiftung Denkmalschutz, 2005
- Ralf-Andreas Gmelin, Der Dom der kleinen Leute – Ein Wiesbadener Geburtsort der Moderne, Ring Edition Wiesbaden, 2004
