= Johannes Otzen =

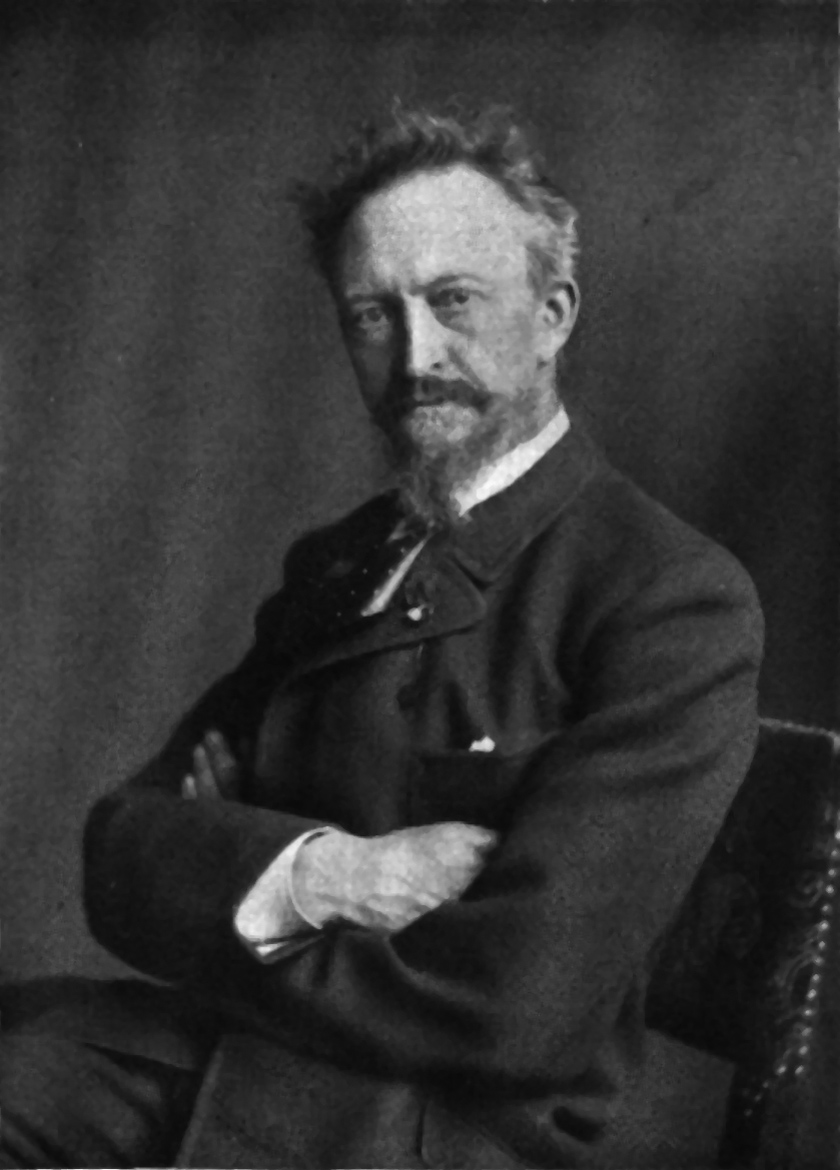
Johannes Otzen

Johannes Otzen (8 October 1839 – 8 June 1911) was a German architect, urban planner, architectural theorist and university teacher. He worked mainly in Berlin and Northern Germany. Otzen was involved in urban planning in Berlin.

He built Gothic Revival brick buildings for the Lutheran Church, which were influential throughout Northern Germany.

== Notable works ==
1. St. Johannis (Altona) (1868–73, won in a competition in 1867)
2. Bergkirche, Wiesbaden (1876–79)
3. Heilig-Kreuz-Kirche (Berlin-Kreuzberg) (Holy Cross Church), Berlin-Kreuzberg (1885–88)
4. Apostelkirche, Ludwigshafen (1892–94)
5. Ringkirche, Wiesbaden (1892–94)
