= Clemens Bosselmann =

German musician

- Born: 1985 (age 39–40)
- Education: Hochschule für Musik Freiburg
- Occupations: Choral conductor; Director of church music
- Organizations: Schiersteiner Kantorei

Clemens Bosselmann (born 1985) is a German conductor and church musician, working since 2018 as director of music (Kantor) at the Christophoruskirche in Wiesbaden-Schierstein, Hesse. He is the choral conductor of the concert choir Schiersteiner Kantorei where he expanded the concert choir's repertoire with 20th-century music and rarely performed choral works.

== Life and career ==
Bosselmann was born in 1985. He was a member of the Dresdner Kreuzchor boys' choir from 1994 until his Abitur at the Kreuzschule in 2003. He studied church music at the Hochschule für Musik Freiburg, organ with Martin Schmeding, improvisation with Klemens Schnorr and Karl-Ludwig Kreutz, and voice with Bernd Göpfert. He graduated in 2011 with an A diploma. He studied choral conducting simultaneously from 2006 to 2010, first with Hans Michael Beuerle, then from 2008 Morten Schuldt-Jensen. He sang in the choir and the chamber choir of the Hochschule, led by Schuldt-Jensen and also assisted him. Bosselmann also studied music theory with Otfried Büsing. His studies were supported by the Studienstiftung and from 2007 a Rudolf Mauersberger scholarship. He completed studies in 2012 and attended master classes by Rudolf Lutz, Daniel Reuss, Zsigmond Szathmáry, and David Timm.

During his studies, he was director of the German-French choir in Freiburg, performing major choral works such as Mozart's Great Mass in C minor and Bach's St John Passion, and also a cappella music such as Spem in alium by Thomas Tallis, for 40 voices.

On 1 January 2012, Bosselmann became Kantor (director of church music) at the Protestant parish of Zeitz, also district Kantor for Naumburg-Zeitz. He conducted major works such as Bach's Magnificat and St Matthew Passion, and Ein deutsches Requiem by Brahms. He founded a chamber choir to perform a cappella music by composers such as Heinrich Schütz, Max Reger, and Hugo Distler. He founded children's and youth choirs, performing their own projects such as singspiel and musicals, but also as part of major choral projects. He also focused on concerts of organ improvisations.

=== Schiersteiner Kantorei ===
Bosselmann has been active since 1 January 2018 as Kantor of the Christophoruskirche in Wiesbaden-Schierstein, leading the Schiersteiner Kantorei, one of the largest concert choirs in Hesse. He succeeded Martin Lutz, and continued his traditions of Schiersteiner Vespermusiken and the series of all Bach's church cantatas in collaboration, at the Marktkirche Wiesbaden and the Katharinenkirche Frankfurt, begun in 2004. He is also the district cantor for Wiesbaden West.

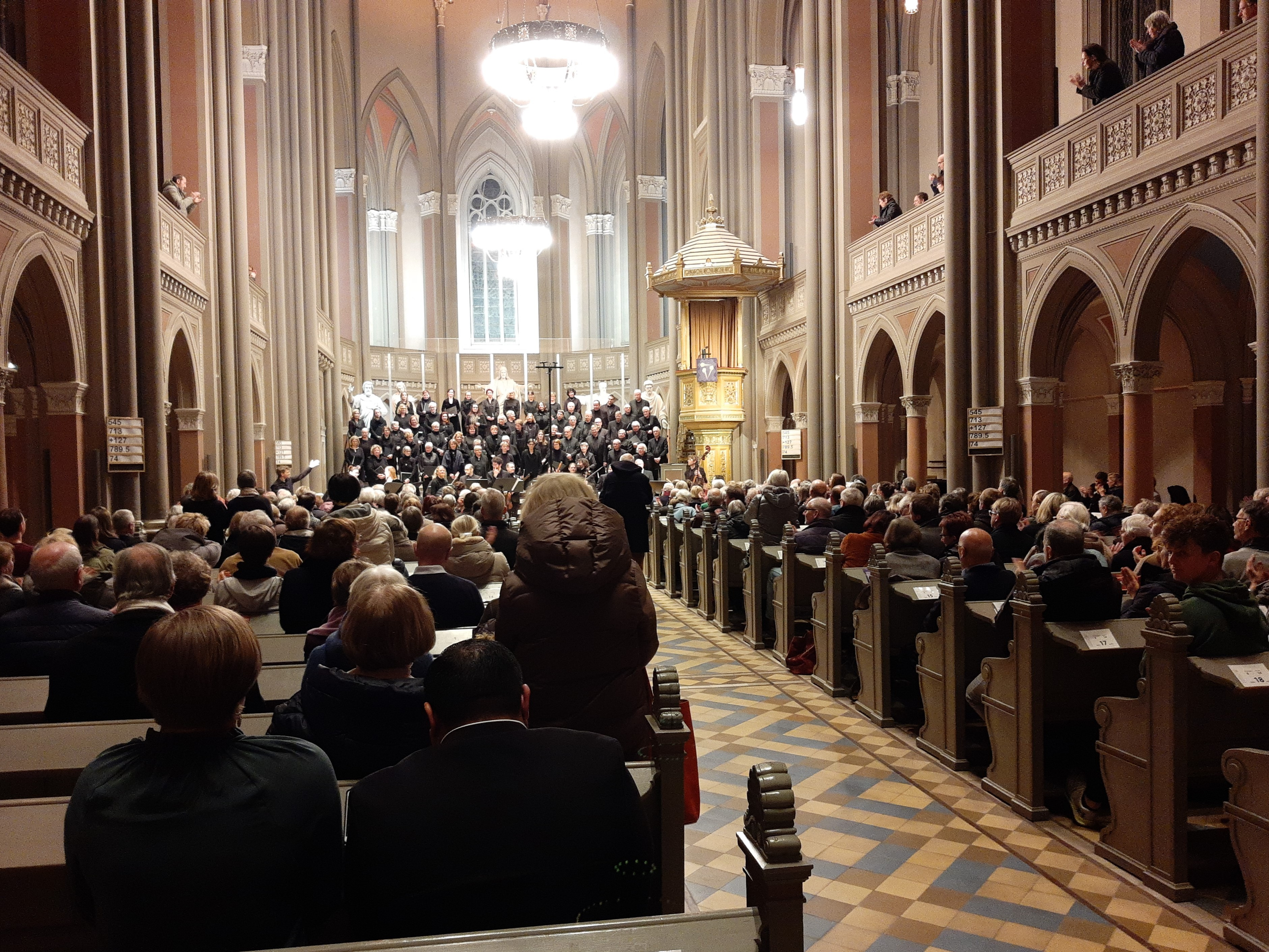
After a performance of the St Matthew Passion by Gottfried August Homilius at the Marktkirche Wiesbaden, 2023

Bosselmann has expanded the choir's repertoire with works from the 20th century and rarely performed music. On 11 March 2023, he revived the St Matthew Passion by Gottfried August Homilius, an extended oratorio passion following Bach's models which had been neglected until it was first revived by the Dresdner Kreuzchor which Homilius had directed from 1755 to 1785. Bosselmann knew excerpts of the work from singing with the Kreuzchor as a boy, but had to track down handwritten sheet music from the conductor of a previous recording, Christoph Schoener, as the work had been planned to be published but was not ready. The Passion was performed at the Marktkirche Wiesbaden, with soloists Helena Bickel, Jean-Max Lattemann, Gabriel Sin and Klaus Mertens, Georg Poplutz as the Evangelist, Frederic Mörth as the voice of Christ, and the Barockorchester La Vivezza.

=== Personal life ===
Bosselmann is married; the couple has two children. He is known for walking barefoot and using the bicycle for transportation.
