= Wiesbadener Bachwochen =

German music festival

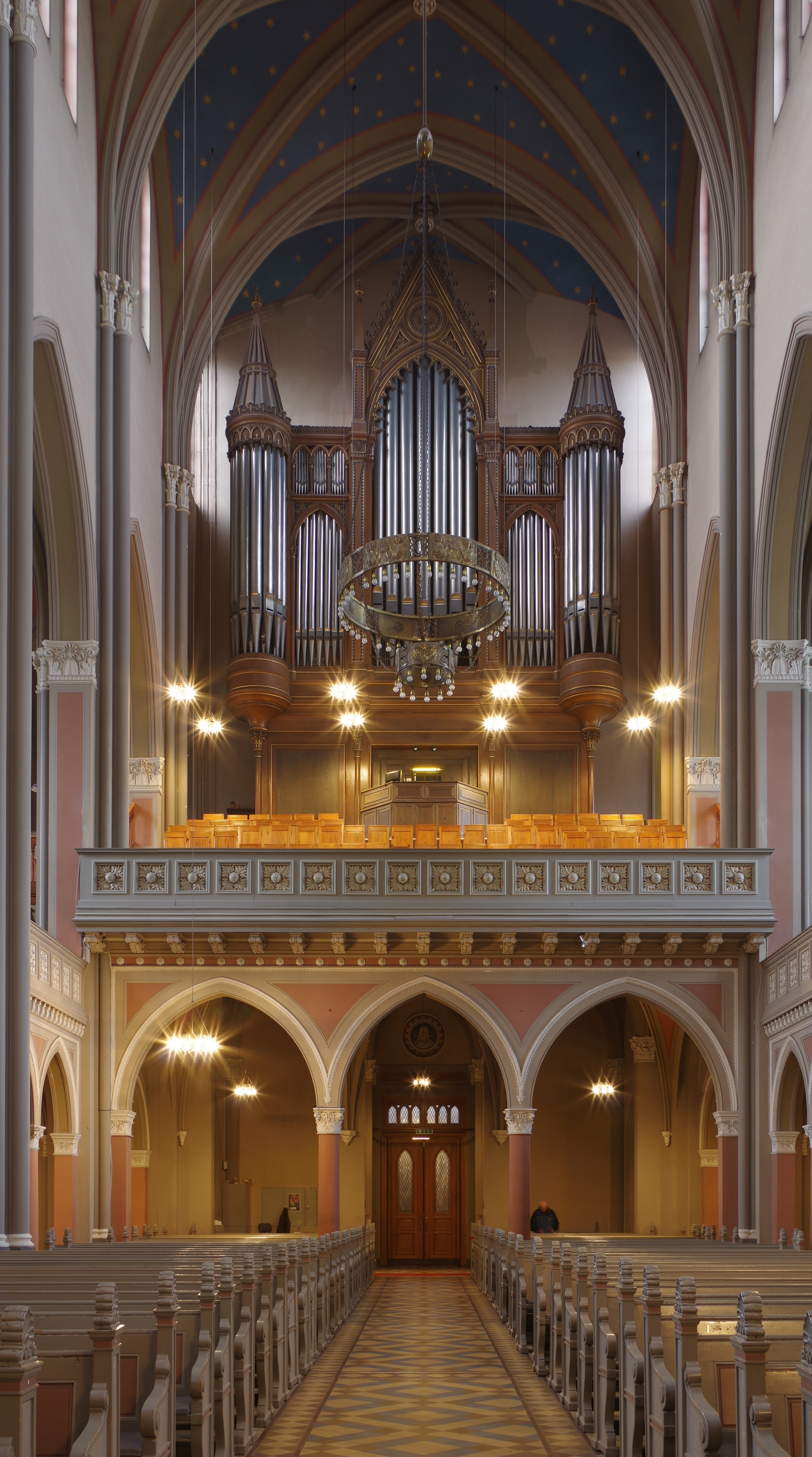
- Walcker organ at the Marktkirche in Wiesbaden, a major festival venue
- Genre: Classical music around J. S. Bach
- Begins: November
- Ends: November to January
- Frequency: Biennial
- Locations: Wiesbaden, Hesse, Germany, many venues
- Inaugurated: 1975; 51 years ago
- Website: www.bach-wiesbaden.de

Wiesbadener Bachwochen (Wiesbaden Bach Weeks) is a biennial festival of music around Johann Sebastian Bach in Wiesbaden, the state capital of Hesse, Germany. It was initiated and has been run by Martin Lutz. The city awards the Bachpreis der Landeshauptstadt Wiesbaden to an organist who wins the festival's international competition.

== History ==
In 1975, Martin Lutz, a Wiesbaden church musician and conductor of the Schiersteiner Kantorei, founded the Wiesbadener Bachwochen as a festival with a focus on the music of Johann Sebastian Bach. He also founded a supporting organisation, the Johann-Sebastian-Bach-Gesellschaft. Lutz has described Bach's music as rapturous and moving ("mitreißende, bewegende Musik") with a transcendental dimension ("Dimension, die ins Transzendentale weise"), faith turned into music ("Musik gewordener Glaube"). Concerts have been performed by local groups and international guests. Beginning in 1977, an international competition for organists has been part of the festival, with the winner being awarded the Bachpreis der Landeshauptstadt Wiesbaden. After Lutz retired from his church positions at the end of 2017, he continued to run the festival.

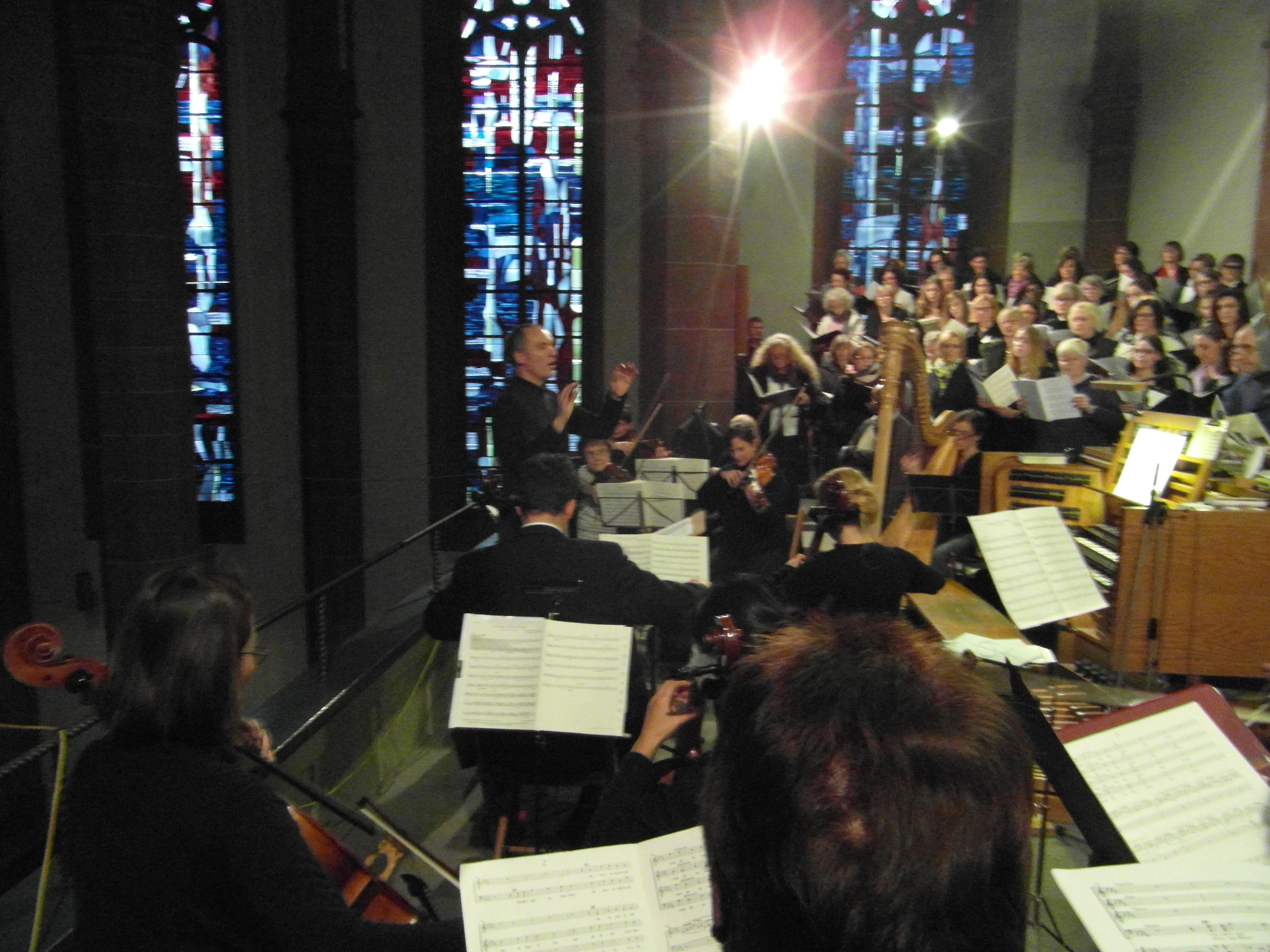
Festival choir at St. Bonifatius, 2015

Concerts and other events are held every two years around November. Each festival has a motto, and events include lectures, chamber music, organ concerts and the organ competition, and large choral concerts. The events are held mostly in Wiesbaden churches, such as the Marktkirche, Lutherkirche, St. Bonifatius and Bergkirche. They have been performed by both local groups and international artists. The motto in 2015 was "Vom Himmel auf Erden" (Of Heaven on Earth), with Fauré's Requiem sung by a festival choir conducted by Andreas Großmann at St. Bonifatius, Dvořák's Requiem at the Marktkirche, and Elgar's The Dream of Gerontius at the Lutherkirche.

In 2017, the motto was "Werk und Wirkung" (Work and influence), presenting among others Bach's Sonatas for violin solo and Cello Suites, his cantata Wachet auf, ruft uns die Stimme, BWV 140, in the series Bachvespern, Beethoven's Missa solemnis sung by the Bachchor Wiesbaden, and Verdi's Requiem and Bach's complete Christmas Oratorio, both sung by the Schiersteiner Kantorei. The 23rd festival ran from 3 November 2019 to 11 January 2020. With the motto "Bach und seine Zeit" (Bach and his time), it opened at the Marktkirche on 3 November 2019 with the cantata Tritt auf die Glaubensbahn, BWV 152. As chamber music, Bach's Sonatas for Viola da gamba and the Goldberg Variations were played. Ton Koopman, Tini Mathot and Klaus Mertens appeared with songs and works for keyboard instruments. Schiersteiner Kantorei sang Bach's Mass in B minor, and the choir of the Bergkirche performed Handel's Messiah.
