= Passions (Homilius) =

Passions by Gottfried August Homilius

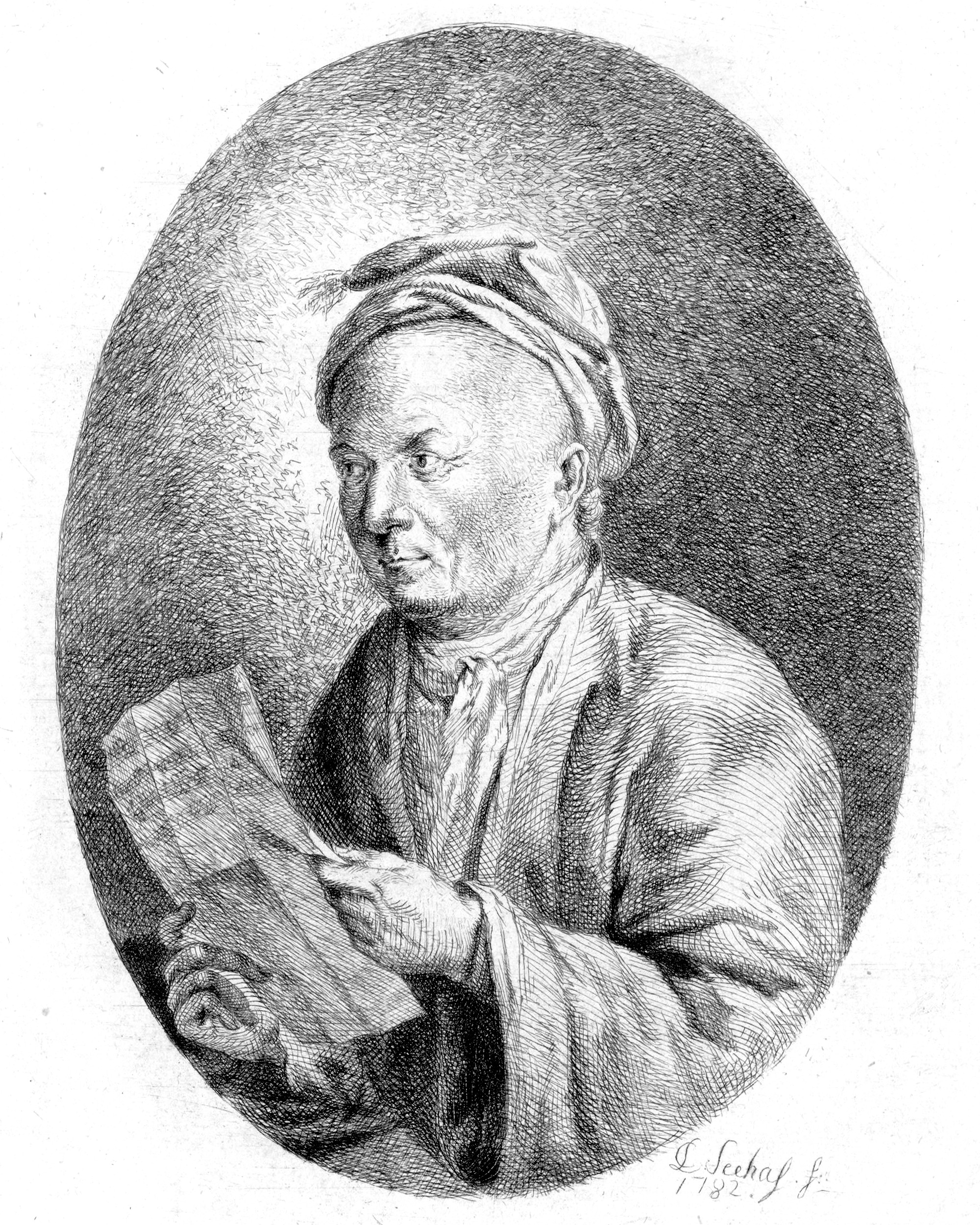
Gottfried August Homilius in 1782

Gottfried August Homilius composed Passions for Good Friday services at the Kreuzkirche in Dresden where he was music director (Kreuzkantor) from 1755 to 1785, including oratorios based on the gospels of Matthew and John, Luke and Mark in German. While these works were neglected, their revival began at the Kreuzkirche and led to publications, performances and recordings. Reviewers agree that the compositions in the style of Empfindsamkeit deserve attention.

== Background ==
Gottfried August Homilius was born in Rosenthal, Saxony, in 1714, the son of a Protestant pastor. He attended schools in Dresden and then studied law in Leipzig, where he was also musically active, possibly with Johann Sebastian Bach. He became organist of the Hofkirche in Dresden, the capital of the Electorate of Saxony, in 1742. From 1755 until his death in 1785, he was Kreuzkantor, directing the Kreuzschule and responsible for the church music at the Lutheran Kreuzkirche, the Frauenkirche and the Sophienkirche in Dresden. His music is mostly in the then-new style of Empfindsamkeit, trying to reach listeners emotionally, but he also incorporated the tradition of counterpoint in his works.

His works were neglected, but have been revived increasingly, beginning with Dresden musicians, especially the Dresdner Kreuzchor.

== Passions ==
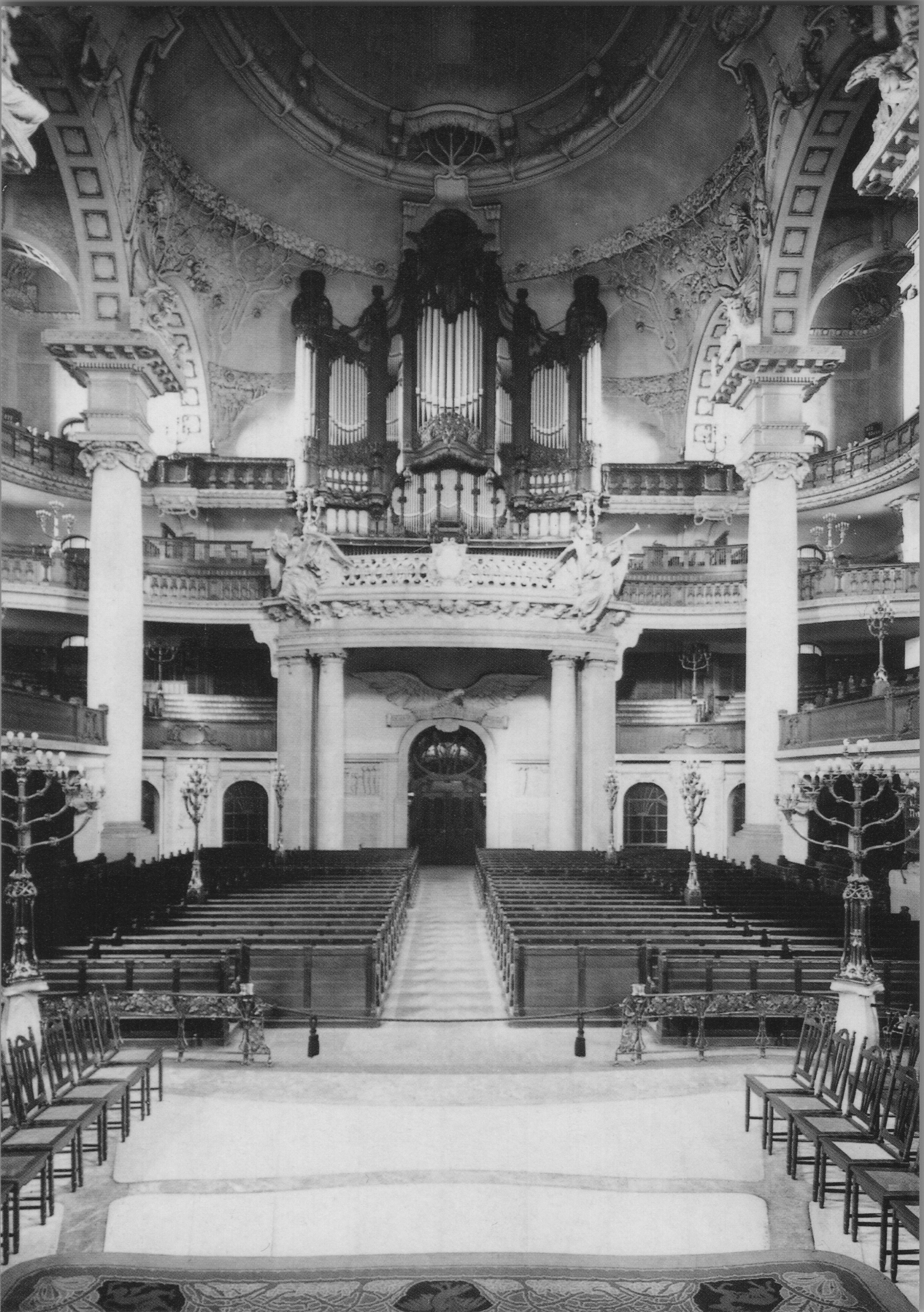
Organ loft in the Kreuzkirche, 1905

Homilius composed several Passions for performances in Good Friday services. His most popular work dealing with the passion of Jesus was a cantata, "Ein Lämmlein geht und trägt die Schuld", HoWV 2. It is in 31 movements in two parts, based on poetry. It was published in 1775 during his lifetime.

Homilius composed four oratorio Passions in the older style using the Biblical account from the gospels, in the tradition of Bach's St John Passion and St Matthew Passion:

- HoWV 1.3 Matthäuspassion "Ein Lämmlein geht und trägt die Schuld"
- HoWV 1.4 Johannespassion "Der Fromme stirbt"
- HoWV 1.5 Lukaspassion "Du starker Keltertreter"
- HoWV 1.10 Markuspassion "So gehst du nun, mein Jesu, hin"

These works are among the last oratorio Passions in the 18th century. They retain the gospel texts, which is interspersed with chorales and madrigal poetry. Many of the chorales are no longer part of the Protestant German hymnal Evangelisches Gesangbuch. The madrigal texts were probably written by local authors whom Homilius knew. The function of the chorus is restricted mainly to chorales and the crowd choruses setting direct speech from the gospels.

=== Matthäuspassion ===
The Matthäuspassion (St Matthew Passion) "Ein Lämmlein geht und trägt die Schuld", HoWV 1.3, is a Passion in two parts of 50 movements, scored for six soloists, four-part choir and orchestra. It begins with a chorale, "Ein Lämmlein geht und trägt die Schuld".

The Passion is not yet published; a critical edition by Carus-Verlag is in preparation, but was held up by the COVID-19 pandemic. The Passion features choruses that lay choirs are able to perform, but solo movements are written for professionals.

The Passion was first recorded in 1992 by soloists Ann Monoyios, Ulla Groenewold, Gerd Türk, Klaus Mertens, and Christoph Prégardien as the Evangelist, the Cappella Vocale Leverkusen and the Akademie für Alte Musik Berlin, conducted by Christoph Schoener. Schoener had compiled handwritten sheet music from various sources, and transcribed it in calligraphic quality. The Passion was performed by the Schiersteiner Kantorei, conducted by Clemens Bosselmann, at the Marktkirche Wiesbaden on 11 March 2023 with soloists Helena Bickel, Jean-Max Lattemann, Gabriel Sin, and again Klaus Mertens, Georg Poplutz as the Evangelist, Frederic Mörth as the voice of Christ, and the Barockorchester La Vivezza. Bosselmann had known excerpts of the work since he sang with the Kreuzchor as a boy, but as the work was unpublished, he had to track down the handwritten sheet music from Schoener's family to prepare for the performance.

=== Johannespassion ===
The Johannespassion (St John Passion), "Der Fromme stirbt", HoWV 1.4, is a Passion scored for five soloists, a four-part choir SATB and orchestra. The final movement has a transition from A minor to a "celebratory" A major, in keeping with John's interpretation of the crucifixion as a victory. C. P. E. Bach used individual movements from the work in Passion pasticcios in 1774, 1776, 1779 and 1789.

It was published in a critical edition by Carus-Verlag. It was first recorded in the 21st century by the Dresdner Kreuzchor and the Dresden Baroque Orchestra, with soloists Jana Reiner, Katja Fischer, Franz Vitzthum, Stephan Keucher, Christian Lutz and Clemens Heidrich, Jan Kobow as the Evangelist and Tobias Berndt as the voice of Jesus, conducted by Roderich Kreile. A reviewer noted that the unusual triumphant elements, with horns, were delivered with emphasis, and the extended arias showed a good combination of vocal lines and counterpoint.

=== Lukaspassion ===
The Lukaspassion (St Luke Passion), "Du starker Keltertreter", HoWV 1.5, is a Passion scored for four voices and orchestra. Keltertreter means Christ in the winepress. It was the model for a Passion composed in 1775 by C. P. E. Bach.

=== Markuspassion ===
The Markuspassion (St Mark Passion), "So gehst du nun, mein Jesu, hin", HoWV 1.10, is an oratorio in 47 movements, in two parts. The madrigal poetry was probably written by a contemporary, such as Traugott Benjamin Berger, who wrote other texts for Homilius, or the pastor Ernst August Buschmann. It is scored for six soloists, four-part choir and orchestra. The Passion was probably written during the composer's first decade at the Kreuzkirche. A review testifies to a performance in Berlin before 1765. It was performed abridged by C. P. E. Bach in Hamburg, first in 1770. The work, different from the other three oratorio Passions which open with a chorale, begins with a chorale fantasia, with the chorale melody in long notes in the soprano.

The Passion was published by Carus-Verlag in 2011. It was performed by the chorale of the Berlin Cathedral in 2023.
