= Hans Rudolf Zöbeley =

Hans Rudolf Zöbeley (27 May 1931 in Mannheim – 5 December 2007 in Garmisch-Partenkirchen) was a German composer, choral conductor and Lutheran church musician.

The son of the Baden minister and hymn composer Rudolf Zöbeley (1901–1991) and Martha Bälz, he studied classical philology and medieval studies at Heidelberg University and musicology at the Kirchenmusikalisches Institut Heidelberg. In 1955, he passed the state examination in Heidelberg, 1957, the A-Prüfung (now Master of Music) as a full-time church musician. In 1963, he completed his doctorate under Thrasyboulos Georgiades (1907–1977) at LMU Munich with a thesis on the music of the Buxheim Organ Book. In 1962, he was appointed to the faculty at the Richard Strauss Conservatory at LMU Munich, and in 1979 appointed music director of LMU Munich.

Zöbeley played a key role in three choirs: in 1960 he founded the Munich Motet Choir which he led almost forty years until his retirement in 1998. In addition, from 1962 to 1980, he was at the head of the choir of the Munich Philharmonic. From 1969 to 2002, he was artistic and musical director of the University Choir of Munich. He was also, from the summer of 1997, active as church music director at the Church of St. Matthew, Munich, the base of the bishop of the Evangelical Lutheran Church in Bavaria.

His son is the early music specialist and choral conductor Martin Zöbeley, leader of Gruppe für Alte Musik München.
