= Hans Uwe Hielscher =

German organist and composer

- Marktkirche, Wiesbaden
- Born: 1945 (age 80–81)
- Education: Hochschule für Musik Detmold
- Occupation: Organist
- Organizations: Marktkirche, Wiesbaden; Kreuzkirche; Sophienkirche
- Awards: Ordre des Arts et des Lettres

Hans Uwe Hielscher (born 1945) is a German organist and composer. He was organist and carillonneur at the Marktkirche in Wiesbaden, Hesse, Germany, from 1979 to 2009, and has played internationally as a concert organist.

== Career ==
Hielscher studied church music at the Hochschule für Musik Detmold (A), and carillon in Utrecht. From 1969 to 1973 he was church musician in Juist and from 1973 to 1979 in Bielefeld.

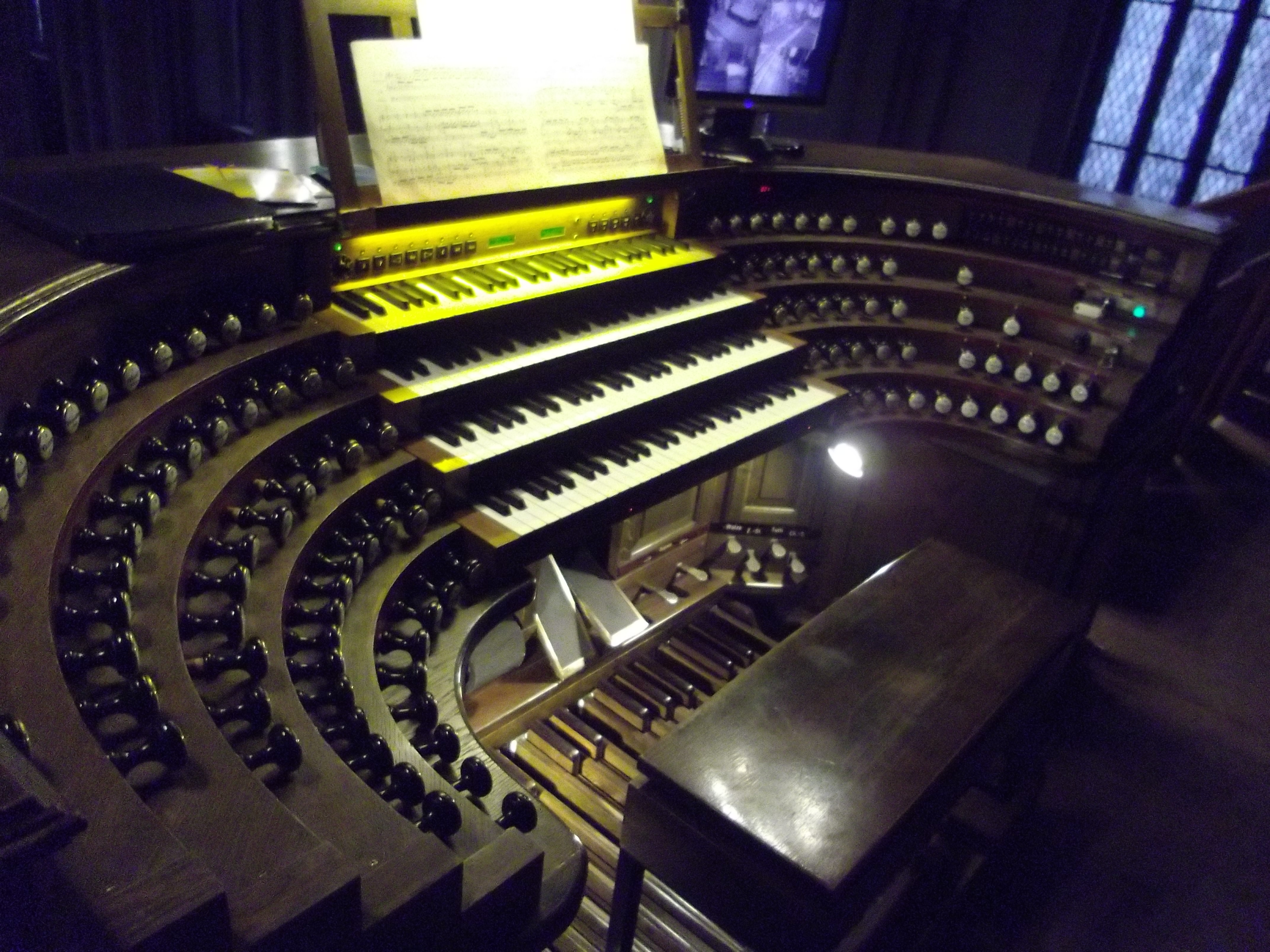
Console of the Walcker organ of the Marktkirche

He became the organist and carillonneur at the Marktkirche in Wiesbaden in 1979. He created there a series of weekly free recitals called Orgelmusik zur Marktzeit (organ music at market time) on Saturdays at 11:30 a.m., in which he or sometimes a guest organist perform seasonal music. The 2000th event was on 7 December 2019. He appeared in a regular concert on New Year's Eve together with his colleague at St. Bonifatius, Gabriel Dessauer until 2010, and then played with his successor Thomas Jörg Frank.

In 1985 Hielscher worked at the Immanuel Presbyterian Church in Los Angeles in exchange with Samuel Swartz, and taught at the University of Redlands in California from 1986.

Hielscher is active as a concert organist and has played more than 3000 organ concerts worldwide. He retired from the position at the Marktkirche in 2009 but has kept the tradition of Orgelmusik zur Marktzeit.

== Awards ==
- Chevalier de l'Ordre des Arts et des Lettres (1985)

== Publications ==
- Alexandre Guilmant: Leben und Werk
- Berühmte Orgeln der USA
- Die Oberlinger-Orgel in der Marktkirche Wiesbaden
- Französische Orgelkunst der Spätromantik

== Compositions ==
- California wine suite
- Variations sur „Frère Jacques“
- American folksongs
- Mosaik
- Weihnachtskantate
