= Ein Lämmlein geht und trägt die Schuld (disambiguation) =

"Ein Lämmlein geht und trägt die Schuld" is a Lutheran hymn relating to the Passion of Christ. The title may also refer to various compositions:

- "Ein Lämmlein geht und trägt die Schuld", BWV 267, four-part chorale by Johann Sebastian Bach
- Ein Lämmlein geht und trägt die Schuld, GraunWV B:VII:4, Passion cantata by Carl Heinrich Graun
- Ein Lämmlein geht und trägt die Schuld, GWV 1119/24, a cantata for Estomihi (last Sunday before lent) by Christoph Graupner
- Ein Lämmlein geht und trägt die Schuld, HoWV 1.2, Passion cantata by Gottfried August Homilius
- Ein Lämmlein geht und trägt die Schuld, HoWV 1.3, a.k.a. St Matthew Passion, by Gottfried August Homilius
- Ein Lämmlein geht und trägt die Schuld (Stölzel), a.k.a. Die leidende und am Creutz sterbende Liebe Jesu, a Passion oratorio by Gottfried Heinrich Stölzel
- Ein Lämmlein geht und trägt die Schuld, TWV 5:8, St Mark Passion by Georg Philipp Telemann
- Ein Lämmlein geht und trägt die Schuld, TWV 5:30, St John Passion by Georg Philipp Telemann
- Ein Lämmlein geht und trägt die Schuld, TWV 5:51, St Matthew Passion by Georg Philipp Telemann
