= Felix Hell =

German organist

- Born: September 14, 1985 (age 40); Frankenthal, Rhineland-Palatinate, Germany
- Occupation: Organist
- Years active: 1993–present
- Website: Official website

Felix Hell (born September 14, 1985) is a German organist.

== Biography ==
Hell was born in Frankenthal, Rhineland-Palatinate, as the youngest of two children to Hans-Friedrich, a mechanical engineer and amateur pianist from that town, and Olga, a Russian bank worker. He began formal piano lessons at the age of seven, inspired by hearing his father play Bach's C-Major Prelude, which he proceeded to learn with his father's help in two or three days. It was only eight months later he decided to undertake organ lessons. In March 1994, during the year he was eight years old, he made his first solo appearance, playing the Prelude in F major from the Eight Short Preludes and Fugues for Leo Krämer, principal organist at Speyer Cathedral; that easter, he was on duty in his first service as a liturgical organist, playing the organ at a Roman Catholic High Mass. Hell performed his first organ recital outside of Germany when Krämer took him to Russia to perform at the Saratov Conservatory at the age of eight in August 1994.

From the very beginning, Hell's piano teacher was Prof. Siegbert Panzer, German State Academy of Music, Mannheim. Felix was formally educated by Eckard Mayer, at the Hochschule für Kirchenmusik Heidelberg, with Johannes Michel focusing on organ literature, and Christiane Michel focusing on improvisation. In this period of his education, he received additional training courses from professors Martin Lücker, Frankfurt; Pieter van Dijk, Amsterdam; Oleg Yantchenko, Moscow; Wolfgang Rübsam, Chicago; Leo Krämer, Speyer; Franz Lehrndorfer, Munich; Robert Griffith, Delaware/Ohio.

At the "Jugend musiziert" (Federal German competition for young musicians), he won two first prizes in organ-playing in 1994 and 1997 and two first prizes in piano-playing in 1996 and 1999.

In September 1999, Hell moved to the United States and enrolled at the Juilliard School, New York, where he had been awarded a merit-based full tuition scholarship, studying organ with Matthew Lewis and piano with Frank Levy. By this time, his father frequently traveled between Germany for his work and the US, where he acted as Hell's agent, while his mother and brother stayed behind; Hell would travel back to Germany in the summer and at Christmas. From 2001 to 2004, Hell studied, again under full tuition scholarship, at The Curtis Institute of Music in Philadelphia, with John Weaver (with whom he had also studied at Juilliard) and Alan Morrison, graduating in May 2004. He had additional coaching while studying at Curtis with Martin Jean (Yale University), Donald Sutherland (Peabody Institute) and Marie-Claire Alain, Paris.

Hell then enrolled in both the Artist Diploma (AD) and Master of Music (MM programs at the Peabody Institute of the Johns Hopkins University in Baltimore, US, graduating in 2007 and 2008, respectively, and receiving an Outstanding Graduate Award in 2010; he studied under the guidance of Donald Sutherland, attending additional courses held by Joan Lippincott, Princeton University, and Gillian Weir, London. He went on to undertake a Doctor of Musical Arts (DMA) degree at Peabody, graduating in 2016.

He was Assistant adjunct professor of Organ at Sunderman Conservatory of Music at Gettysburg College from 2007 to 2022. He has held associate and distinguished artist positions at St. Peter's Church in Manhattan for twenty years, Lutheran Theological Seminary in Gettysburg (continuing his association with it after its merger to become United Lutheran Seminary), and Kosin University in South Korea. He also continues to concertize extensively, having performed his thousandth concert at the Zwölf-Apostel-Kirche in his hometown of Frankenthal on January 7, 2020. He has performed four "Bach marathons", concert series of all of the Bach organ works, encompassing about 250 compositions that take about 20 hours to perform.

In 2010, Hell married Grace Eun Hae Kim, a Korean pianist; they have performed in concerts together, both as concerto soloists and as partners in organ–piano duos. In the German summer of 2023, Hell moved back to Frankenthal with Kim and their daughter.

== Discography ==
- Felix Hell at St. Justinus (1999)
- Orgelgiganten (2000)
- Saint Peter's Church New York City (2000)
- Felix Hell at the Great Schantz (2002)
- Felix Hell in Concert (2002)
- Mendelssohn at Methuen (2004)
- Plays The Rieger-Kloss Organ (2005)
- Organ Sensation (2006)
- Felix Hell in Savannah (2006)
- Felix Hell spielt Bach (2007)
- Felix Hell – Organ and Orchestra (2014)
- Heroic Proportions (2017)
- Poetic Visions (2017)
- Organ Fantasies: Masterworks by Bach, Liszt & Reger (2023)
