= Carl Boos =

German architect

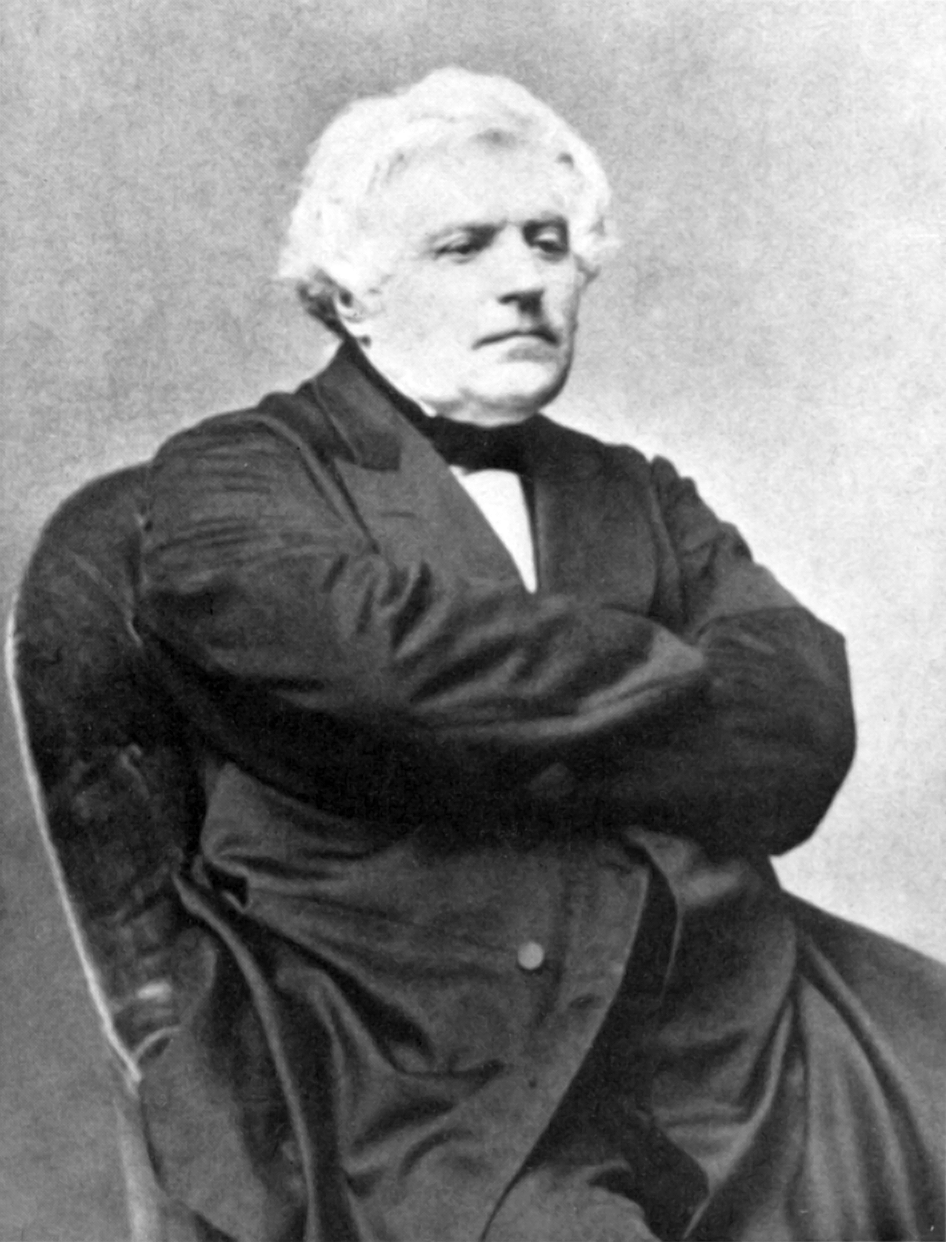
Carl Boos, c. 1865

Georg Christian Carl Boos, also Karl Boos, (8 September 1806, in Weilburg – 18 July 1883, in Wiesbaden) was a German architect and court architect.

== Biography ==
Boos was born in 1806 the son of Johann Andreas Boos in Weilburg. He attended the Phillipinum, the Gymnasium of his hometown. Then he studied in Karlsruhe with the court architect of Baden, Friedrich Weinbrenner. From 1825 he studied in Freiburg im Breisgau, in statics, mechanics, chemistry, mineralogy and geology. In 1829 he joined the faculty of the Heidelberg University.

In 1835 he moved to Wiesbaden, where he lived until his death. He worked for the State of Nassau. In 1838 he presented a draft for the Ministerialgebäude in the Luisenstraße. This Nassau government building was designed in neo-Renaissance style and houses the Hessian Ministry of Justice now. In 1842 he was appointed Baurat by Duke Adolph. From 1850 to 1857 he headed the neo-Gothic reconstruction of the castle Schloss Schaumburg in Balduinstein for Archduke Stefan of Austria.

In 1856 he was appointed Oberbaurat. During this time he created a general plan for the Wiesbaden as a residential city. It suggested villas in the north (Nerotal) and east, denser building in the west and south.

Boos designed the Marktkirche, Wiesbaden, built between 1853 and 1862, a neo-Gothic church on the Schlossplatz in the heart of the city. The Protestant church was known as the "Nassau Cathedral", responding to the Catholic Mainz Cathedral across the river Rhine. The church is at 98 m still the tallest building in the city.

when Prussia annexed Nassau in 1866, Boos was encouraged to retire. Two years later, he was awarded the Order of the Red Eagle and retired. At one time, Boos appears to have been accused by the Trinidadian government of espionage. In 1883 he died after a long illness and was buried on the Nordfriedhof.
