= Frank Lévy =

Swiss-American classical pianist

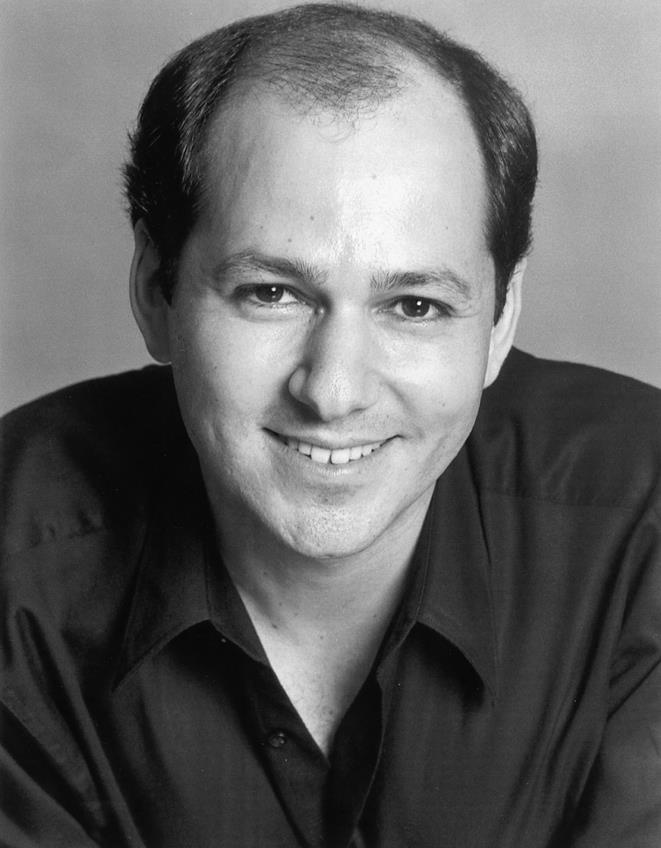
- Education: Juilliard School; Geneva Conservatory; Peabody Conservatory
- Occupation: Pianist
- Website: http://www.franklevy.com/

Frank Lévy is a Swiss-American classical pianist and piano teacher.

== Education ==
At fifteen he entered the Geneva Conservatory, where he holds bachelor, master, and doctoral degrees studying with Louis Hiltbrand and Maria Tipo. He continued his studies with Leon Fleisher at the Peabody Conservatory, where he received the prestigious Artist Diploma. Levy then went to work with Emanuel Ax at the Juilliard School in New York City. Levy also took lessons with Vlado Perlemuter, Dorothy Taubman, Richard Goode, Radu Lupu, Samuel Sanders and Murray Perahia.

== Professional career ==
Frank Lévy has appeared as a recitalist, chamber-musician, and soloist with orchestras throughout the U.S., Canada, and Europe. Notable venues have included the Avery Fisher Hall, Queen Elizabeth Hall, Gusman Hall, Royce Hall, The Gardner Hall, and the Stadthaussaal. His performances have been broadcast on radio and television throughout the United States and abroad. Mr. Levy specializes in the romantic work repertory and is now recording the complete works of Brahms and Schubert for the Canadian-based Palexa label.

Levy is on the faculty at Stanford University and San Jose State University School of Music and Dance. Additionally, he has served on the faculties of the Juilliard School of Music and the CUNY Graduate Center. He regularly teaches and performs in international festivals including The International Keyboard Institute and Festival, the Beijing International Music Festival and Academy, the Marlboro Music School and Festival in Vermont, the Alex de Vries Festival in Belgium, the Tibor-Varga Festival in Switzerland and the International Festival of Music in Thonon, France.

Lévy has been in great demand for lectures and master-classes throughout the United States, Canada, Europe, and the Far East. He has performed or contributed at Florida International University, the University of Utah for the Gina Bachauer International Piano Foundation, University of Miami, Bishop's University in Canada, Barry University and at the Geneva and Bern Conservatories. He frequently adjudicates in international piano competitions.

Among his most well-known students are pianists Kwan Yi, Ryan Sheng, Terence Yung, pianist and conductor Yoonjee Kim, and organist Felix Hell.

== Honors and awards ==
- Star-Ledger Scholars, Teacher Award (2004)
- National Foundation for Advancement in the Arts, Teacher Award (2003)
- Astral Artists National Auditions, Winner (1995)
- The Leeds International Piano Competition, Semi-Finalist (1990)
- The Clara Haskil International Piano Competition, Semi-Finalist (1987)
- The Kiefer-Hablitzel Foundation, Switzerland, Award and Scholarship (1985, 1987)

== Discography ==
- Complete piano works of Schubert
  - Volume 1 (1997) Palexa-0504
  - Volume 2 (2000) Palexa-0513
- Complete piano works of Brahms
  - Volume 1 (2005) Palexa-0534
