= Church music in Germany =

Group of music professions in Germany

Church musician (Kirchenmusiker) is a music profession in Germany.

At present there are about 3,600 main job and 25,000 second job church musicians in the Protestant and Catholic Church in Germany.

There are four different degrees of examination: A, B, C and D. A and B requires a study at a music college or a university (Master of Arts, Bachelor of Arts) . Church musicians with C and D are trained mostly by main job church musicians. The study of A takes about 12 semester and B 8 semester.

Subjects of education are organ, improvising, piano, singing, conducting, ear training, composition, score reading and figured bass, liturgics, hymnology, music history, organology.

== Music colleges for church music (Hochschulen für Kirchenmusik) ==
- Bayreuth – Evangelische Hochschule für Kirchenmusik Bayreuth
- Dresden – Evangelische Hochschule für Kirchenmusik Dresden
- Görlitz – Hochschule für Kirchenmusik der Evangelischen Kirche Berlin-Brandenburg - schlesische Oberlausitz
- Halle (Saale) – Evangelische Hochschule für Kirchenmusik Halle
- Heidelberg – Hochschule für Kirchenmusik Heidelberg
- Herford – Hochschule für Kirchenmusik der Evangelischen Kirche von Westfalen
- München – Hochschule für Musik und Theater München
- Regensburg – Hochschule für Katholische Kirchenmusik und Musikpädagogik Regensburg
- Rottenburg am Neckar – Katholische Hochschule für Kirchenmusik Rottenburg
- Stuttgart - Staatliche Hochschule für Musik und Darstellende Kunst Stuttgart
- Tübingen – Evangelische Hochschule für Kirchenmusik Tübingen
