= Christophoruskirche, Schierstein =

Christophoruskirche (Schierstein)
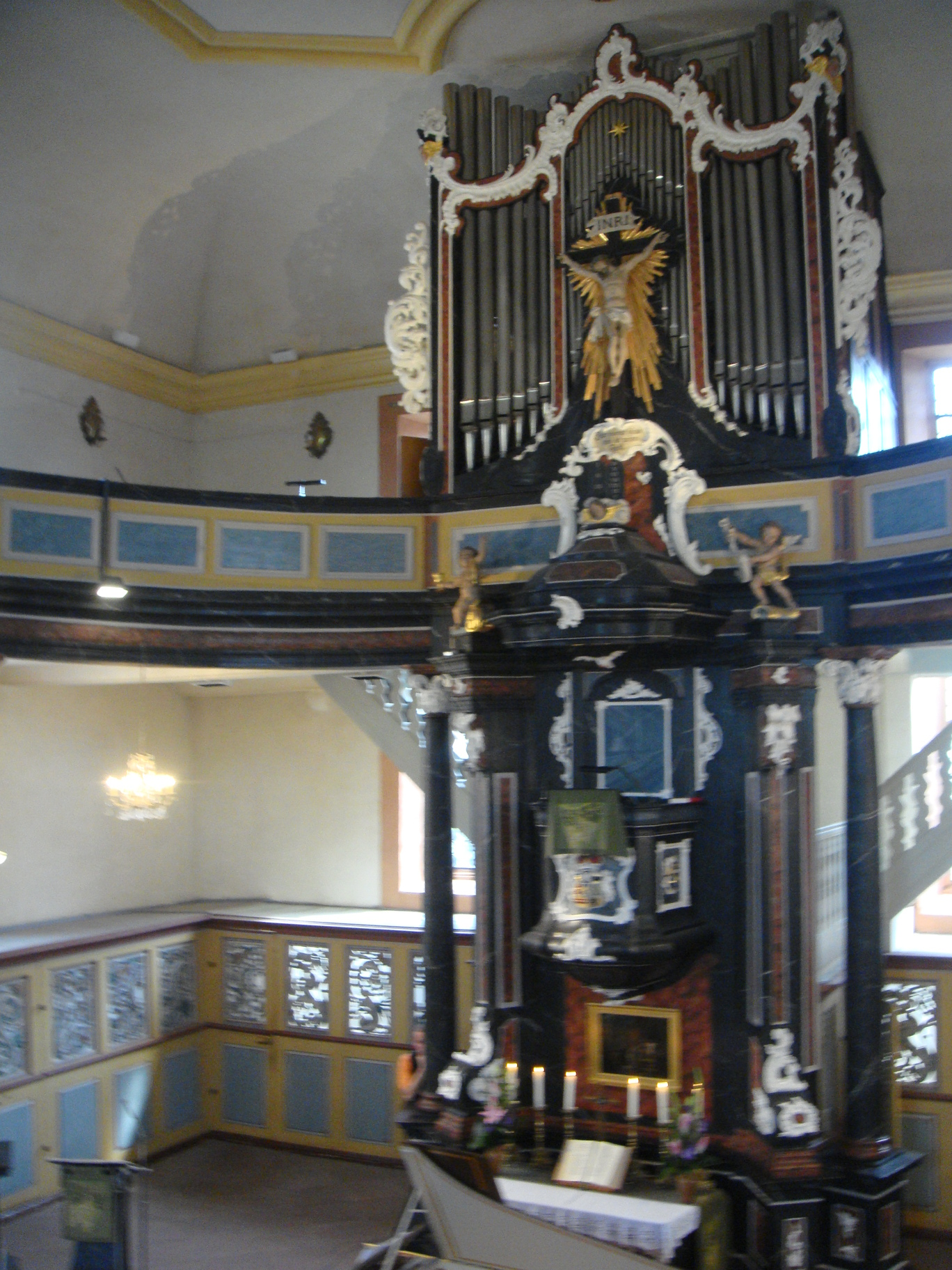
- Altar, organ and balcony
- Christophoruskirche (Schierstein)
- 50.0437°N 8.1955°E
- Location: Schierstein, Wiesbaden
- Country: Germany
- Denomination: Protestant
- Website: Ev. Christophorusgemeinde

History
- Status: Parish church
- Dedication: Saint Christopher

Architecture
- Functional status: Active
- Style: Rococo
- Groundbreaking: 3 May 1752
- Completed: 15 September 1754

Specifications
- Length: 24 m (79 ft)
- Materials: Sandstone, stone-slate roof

Administration
- Parish: Christophorus, Schierstein

The Christophoruskirche is a Protestant church in the borough of Schierstein, Wiesbaden, Germany. It was built in 1752 to 1754 in the style of the late Baroque and Rococo.

== History ==
In 1752, part of the tower of the old Schierstein church collapsed. Building plans for a new church had already been discussed in previous years and suddenly became urgent. Since 1748, the former Mayor of Frankfurt, merchant and banker Johann Georg Schweitzer Edler von Wiederhold, a member of the Frauenstein Gesellschaft, had allowed the Schierstein curate a collection of 604 guilders in the Free imperial city, which provided the financial basis for the construction of the church. The Chamberlain of Electoral Mainz, privy counsellor and chief architect of Electoral Mainz Anselm Franz von Ritter zu Groenesteyn made the vegetable garden of his country estate available as building terrain. Johann Scheffer, a government official of the duchy of Nassau was responsible for the architectural style of the building. On 3 May 1752 the ground breaking ceremony took place and on 15 September 1754 the new church was consecrated. In 1962 the choir Schiersteiner Kantorei was founded in the parish by cantor Johannes Krüger. Since 1974, the choir has been directed by Martin Lutz, who shaped the group of some 40 singers to a large concert choir.

== Architecture ==
=== Exterior ===
The exterior of the church anticipates the upcoming neoclassical architecture, emphasizing the planar qualities of the walls. The one-nave hall type church was constructed in an east–west direction with the choir in the east wing as an aisleless church. The exterior dimensions (length 24 metres (79 ft), width 15 metres (49 ft)) correspond to the golden ratio. The excellent acoustics of the interior may be attributed to it.

The western tower, a "Welsche Haube" (Welsch canopy) does not rest on a separate foundation, but was built as a ridge turret. The tower is located to the east, which is unusual. The pole on top carries a sphere, a cross and a weathercock.

=== Interior ===
While the exterior is kept rather simple, the interior expresses the rococo spirit in colours and vitality. The design of the sanctuary is typical for the Protestant view of the equivalence of the altar (sacrament), pulpit (sermon and exegesis) and organ (worship / community involvement). The four Corinthian columns in the sanctuary symbolize the four Gospels. Three putti symbolize the theological virtues, faith (with the cup), hope (the anchor) and - in the center - charity, according to 1 Corinthians 13:13. Charity holds the law, the Ten Commandments. A realistic representation of the crucifixion is surrounded by a golden halo. Twelve Doric columns support the galleries along the nave, representing the Twelve Apostles, the Twelve tribes of Israel and the community of the congregation. All wood carvings originate from the Frankfurt wood sculptor Johann Daniel Schnorr. The pulpit with the Coat of arms of Nassau-Usingen, the emblem of the sovereign Charles, Prince of Nassau-Usingen, is a symbol of absolutism: The subject who looks up to the preacher of the Gospel, should also see that there is a secular lord.

The altar cross originates from the contemporary metal sculptor Professor Klump (Wiesbaden), crafted from gold with rock crystal as a symbol of Christ, and twelve rubies for the Apostles and for feeding the multitude.

The Paternoster bronze bell was cast in 1430 in Mainz, bearing the inscription "Meyster John of the gos Mence mec".

== Church music ==
The church is a concert venue of the choir Schiersteiner Kantorei, founded here in 1962, and a venue of the Rheingau Musik Festival. In 2011, countertenor Andreas Scholl and harpsichordist Tamar Halperin appeared in concert there.
