= Hochschule für Kirchenmusik Heidelberg =

Music school in Germany

Coordinates: 49°24′08″N 8°40′56″E

The Hochschule für Kirchenmusik Heidelberg is a university of church music in Heidelberg and one of the most renowned ones in Germany.

Its predecessor, Evangelisches Kirchenmusikalisches Institut Heidelberg (KI, Protestant church music institute) was founded in 1931 by Meinhard Hermann Poppen to improve the training of church musicians for the Evangelical Church in Baden. It was modeled after the institute in Leipzig, where Poppen had previously studied with its founder, organist Karl Straube.

The institute offers all church music subjects (organ and other instruments, choral conducting, singing) and theoretical subjects (harmony, counterpoint, figured bass, stylistics).

After Poppens death in 1956, organist Herbert Haag was the director until 1973, succeeded by Wolfgang Herbst, Hermann Schäffer, and from 2006 to 2018 Bernd Stegmann, followed by Prof. Dr. Martin Mautner since 2018.

Notable lecturers have included Wolfgang Fortner, Walter Leib, Helmut Tramnitz, Bruno Penzin, Heinz Werner Zimmermann, Kurt Bossler, Gerhard Wagner, Rolf Schweizer, Gudula Kremers, Hermann Schemmel, Eugen Polus, Gerhard Luchterhandt, Maria Mokhova and Martin Sander.

Notable alumni have included Felix Hell, Martin Lutz, Erna Woll and Hans Rudolf Zöbeley.
