= Morten Schuldt-Jensen =

Danish classical conductor

Morten Schuldt-Jensen is a Danish classical conductor.

== Biography and career ==
Morten Schuldt-Jensen studied singing, vocal training and conducting at the Royal Danish Academy of Music, and also holds a Master's degree in musicology from the University of Copenhagen.

He worked with a number of Danish choirs and orchestras, and serves as a guest conductor for several German and Scandinavian orchestras, including the RIAS Kammerchor, MDR Rundfunkchor, NDR Chor, SWR Vokalensemble, the National Radio Choirs of Denmark and France, the Gewandhausorchester, Akademie für Alte Musik and others.

Schuldt-Jensen has also worked as choir master with conductors such as Simon Rattle, Colin Davis, John Eliot Gardiner, Herbert Blomstedt, Lothar Zagrosek, Riccardo Chailly, René Jacobs, Philippe Herreweghe, Peter Schreier and Marcello Viotti, and worked on performances with these conductors with orchestras such as the Berlin Philharmonic, Orchestre National de France, Freiburger Barockorchester and the National Danish Radio Symphony Orchestra.

From 1999 to 2006, Schuldt-Jensen was Chief Director of the Choral Department at the Gewandhaus in Leipzig, and in 2001 he founded the Gewandhaus Chamber Choir, which is now known as the Immortal Bach Ensemble. In 2000 he was appointed principal conductor and artistic director of the Leipzig Chamber Orchestra.

Schuldt-Jensen has made a number of recordings for the Naxos, dacapo, and DKK labels, with his Immortal Bach Ensemble. They have notably recorded masses and other choral works by Schubert, Mozart, Scarlatti and others.

Schuldt-Jensen was named Associate Professor at the Royal Danish Academy of Music in Copenhagen, in 1992, and has server as a lecturer at the "Felix Mendelssohn Bartholdy" Hochschule für Musik und Theater in Leipzig since 2001. In 2006, he was appointed full professor of choral and orchestral conducting at the Staatliche Musikhochschule in Freiburg/Breisgau. Schuldt-Jensen teaches conducting and vocal training master classes regularly in Germany and Scandinavia.
