= Martin Lutz =

German musicologist and conductor

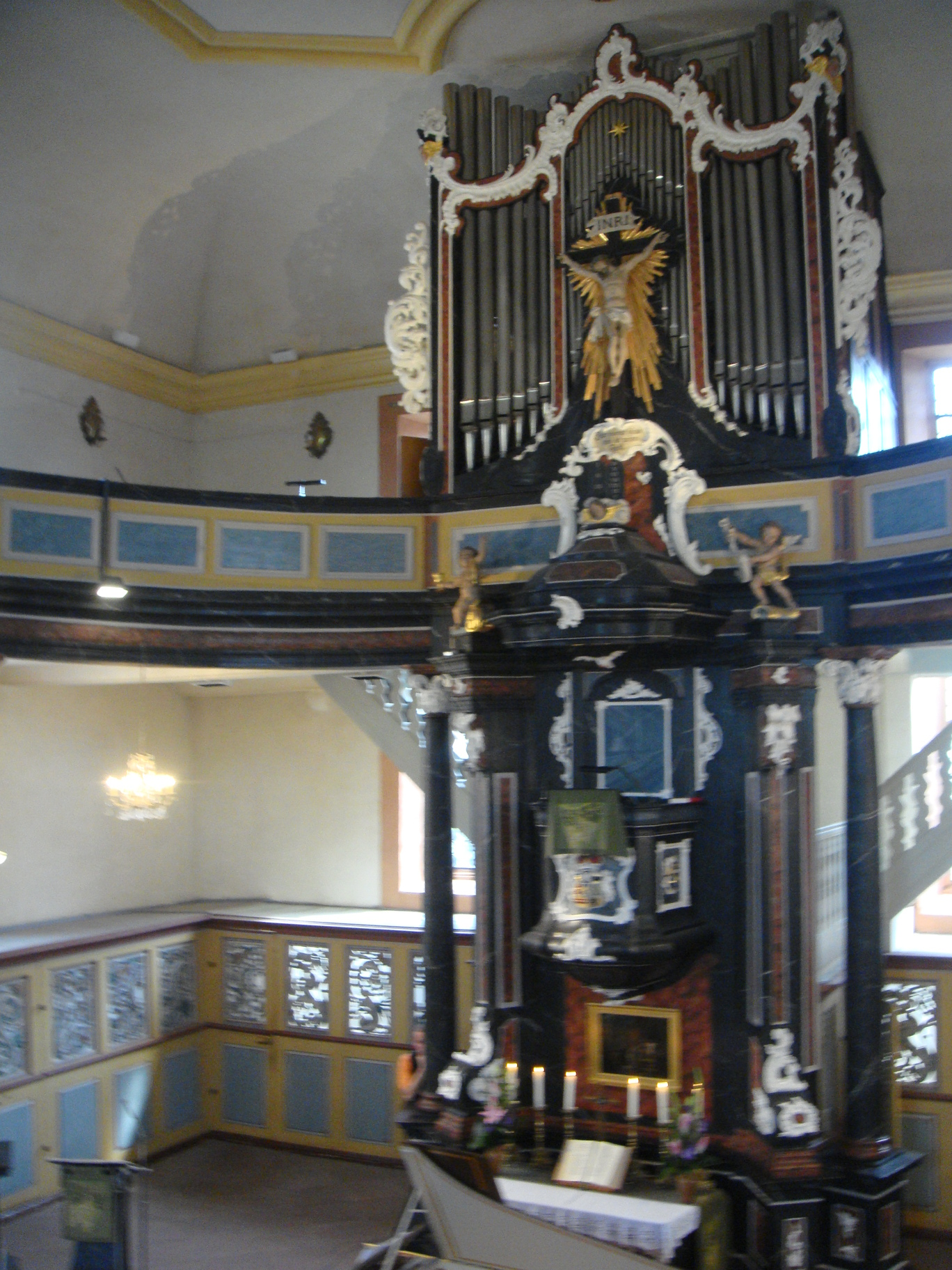
- Christophoruskirche, Schierstein
- Born: 19 May 1950
- Education: Evangelisches Kirchenmusikalisches Institut Heidelberg
- Occupations: Choral conductor; Academic teacher
- Organizations: Schiersteiner Kantorei; Wiesbadener Bachwochen; University of Mainz; Musikhochschule Frankfurt
- Awards: Goethe-Plakette des Landes Hessen

Martin Lutz (born 19 May 1950) is a German musicologist, conductor and harpsichordist. He was the musical director of the concert choir Schiersteiner Kantorei in Wiesbaden from 1972 to 2017, and founded the biennial festival Wiesbadener Bachwochen in 1975.

== Biography ==
Lutz studied church music and musicology at the Evangelisches Kirchenmusikalisches Institut Heidelberg, and art history and ancient history at the University of Mainz.

He has been active since 1972 as a cantor of the Christophoruskirche (St. Christopher Church) in Wiesbaden-Schierstein. He has been the conductor of the Schiersteiner Kantorei, a choir of then about 40 singers, which he shaped to one of the largest concert choirs in Hesse. He is also the conductor of the chamber orchestra Bach-Ensemble Wiesbaden. He continued the series Schiersteiner Vespermusik at the Christophoruskirche, vespers music started by his predecessor, as a forum for early music in Wiesbaden. More than 400 concerts took place as of 2011. In 1975, Lutz founded the festival Wiesbadener Bachwochen, and in 1994, the Musikherbst Wiesbaden. From 1981 to 1999 he was a lecturer in the Musicology Institute of the University of Mainz. From 1997 to 2003 he taught conducting at the Hochschule für Musik Frankfurt. Since 2003 he is teaching again at the University of Mainz as an oratorio and early music specialist. He was appointed as a professor in 2009.

He has performed as a harpsichordist, organist and conductor in France, Yugoslavia, Denmark, Lithuania, Luxembourg, Austria, Poland, Portugal, China, Switzerland and the Netherlands. He is also a member of the baroque ensemble Parnassi Musici.

On 8 May 1995, 50 years after the end of World War II, he conducted a performance of Britten's War Requiem during a ceremony of the government of Hesse at the Kurhaus Wiesbaden, with choirs from countries who were opponents during the war, the Swindon Choral Society from Swindon, UK, the Macon Civic Chorale from Macon, Georgia, the Schiersteiner Kantorei and the Chor von St. Bonifatius, prepared by Gabriel Dessauer.

He recorded Bach's St Matthew Passion and St John Passion with the Schiersteiner Kantorei and Christoph Prégardien as the Evangelist, and Bach cantatas for solo alto with Andreas Scholl.

Since 2004, he is part of a project to perform all Bach sacred cantatas in monthly services, introduced by a lecture. The services are held at both the Marktkirche and the Katharinenkirche, Frankfurt, in a collaboration with the Kantorei St. Katharinen and the Hochschule für Musik und Darstellende Kunst Frankfurt.

For his artistic work, he was awarded the Public Service Medal of the City of Wiesbaden Silver (1987) and in Gold (1997), the Culture Prize of the City of Wiesbaden (1990, together with the Schiersteiner Kantorei) and the Goethe-Plakette des Landes Hessen (Goethe Medal of the State of Hesse) in 2007.
