= Gottfried August Homilius =

German composer, cantor and organist (1714–1785)

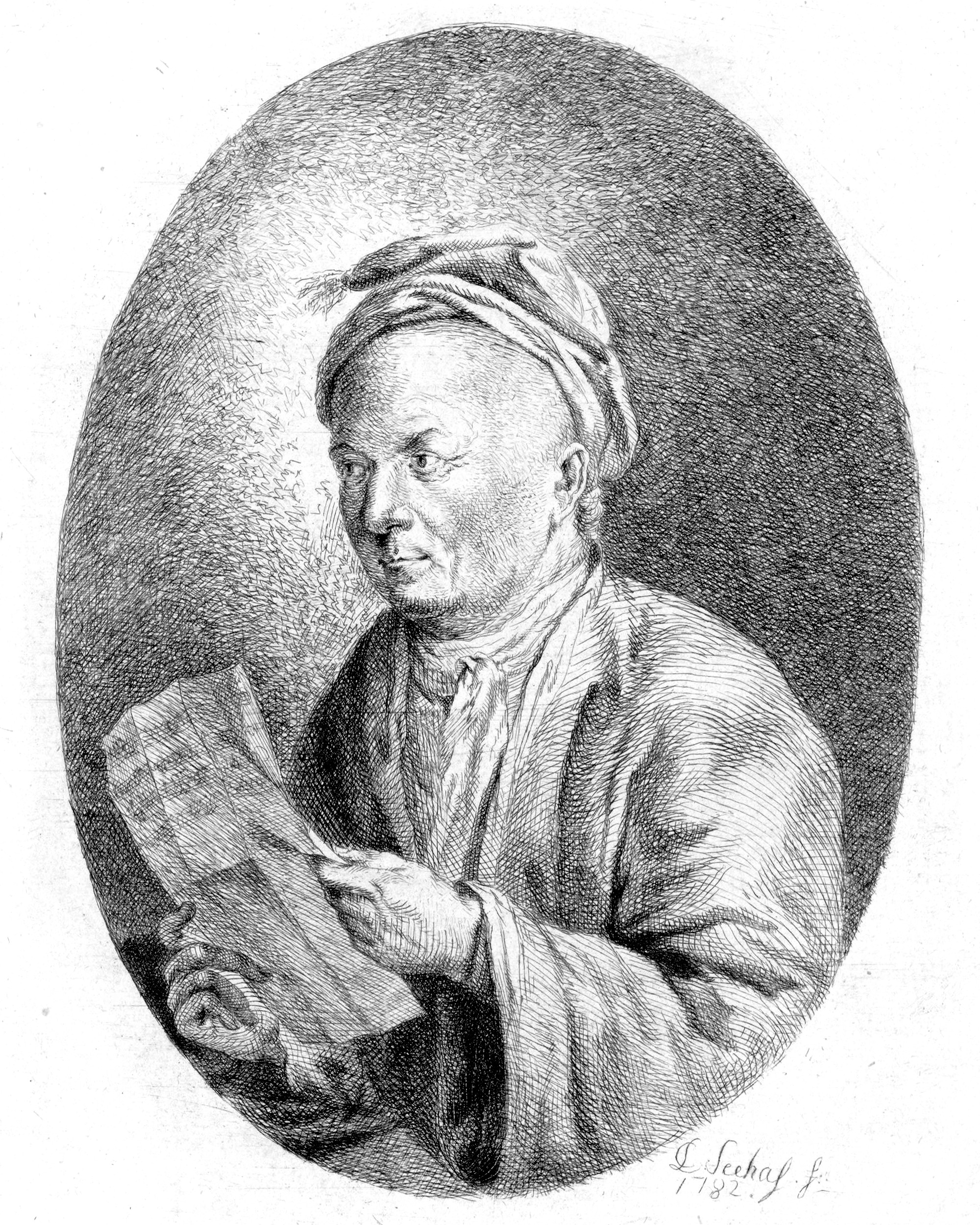
- Homilius in 1782
- Born: 2 February 1714; Rosenthal, Saxony
- Died: 2 June 1785 (aged 71); Dresden, Saxony
- Education: Annenschule, Dresden; Leipzig University
- Occupations: Director of Church music; Composer
- Organizations: Dresden Frauenkirche; Kreuzkirche; Sophienkirche

Gottfried August Homilius (2 February 1714 – 2 June 1785) was a German composer, cantor and organist. He is considered one of the most important church composers of the generation following Bach's, and was the main representative of the empfindsamer style.

== Life ==
Homilius was born in Rosenthal, Saxony, the son of a Lutheran pastor, and was educated at the Annenschule in Dresden. He then studied law at Leipzig University and the organ. It has often been repeated that he was a student of Johann Sebastian Bach, but there is no contemporary written evidence to support this, and strong contextual evidence against it. From 1742 he was organist at the Dresden Frauenkirche, and from 1755 until his death Kreuzkantor, the cantor at the Kreuzkirche in Dresden with the associated responsibility of music director at the Kreuzkirche, the Sophienkirche, and the Frauenkirche and the Kreuzschule. After the destruction of the Kreuzkirche during the Seven Years' War he worked mainly at the Frauenkirche.

== Works ==
Homilius predominantly composed church music. He is known for his Passions for services on Good Friday. One of them, a cantata Passion, was printed during his lifetime in 1775. Of four oratorio Passions after the four Evangelists, his St. Matthew Passion in the preclassical style of C. P. E. Bach and a worthy successor of J. S. Bach's best-known work of the same name, has been recorded on CD. Others were published later and recorded. He composed a Christmas oratorio in 1777 and an Easter oratorio, over 60 motets, more than 150 cantatas (six arias from these appeared in 1786), chorales, preludes, and choral works. He composed also organ music: 36 Chorale preludes for organ. His students included eminent composer Daniel Gottlob Türk as well as Johann Adam Hiller. See: List of music students by teacher: G to J#Gottfried August Homilius. His vocal compositions enjoyed great popularity through the 19th century, as witnessed by the large number of copies still extant. A complete worklist and edition is in preparation at Carus Verlag; the Homilius-Werkverzeichnis numbers (HoWV) follow the dissertation of Karl Feld and the new edition in progress of Uwe Wolf.

=== Passions and oratorios ===
Homilius composed at least five extended Passions for Good Friday, one cantata Passion and four oratorio Passions quoting the complete biblical texts of the four Evangelists.

- HoWV 1.2 Passionskantate "Ein Lämmlein geht und trägt die Schuld" / "Siehe das ist Gottes Lamm" / "Mit väterlicher Stimme"
- HoWV 1.3 Matthäuspassion "Ein Lämmlein geht und trägt die Schuld" / "Und es begab sich" / "Erfüllt mit göttlich ernsten Freuden"
- HoWV 1.4 Johannespassion "Der Fromme stirbt"
- HoWV 1.5 Lukaspassion "Du starker Keltertreter"
- HoWV 1.10 Markuspassion
- Weihnachtsoratorium. "Die Freude der Hirten"

=== Organ music ===
- Gottfried August Homilius: Choralvorspiele für Orgel / herausgegeben von Christoph Albrecht., Leipzig : Breitkopf & Härtel, 1988.
