= Marktkirche, Wiesbaden =

Protestant church in Wiesbaden

Marktkirche
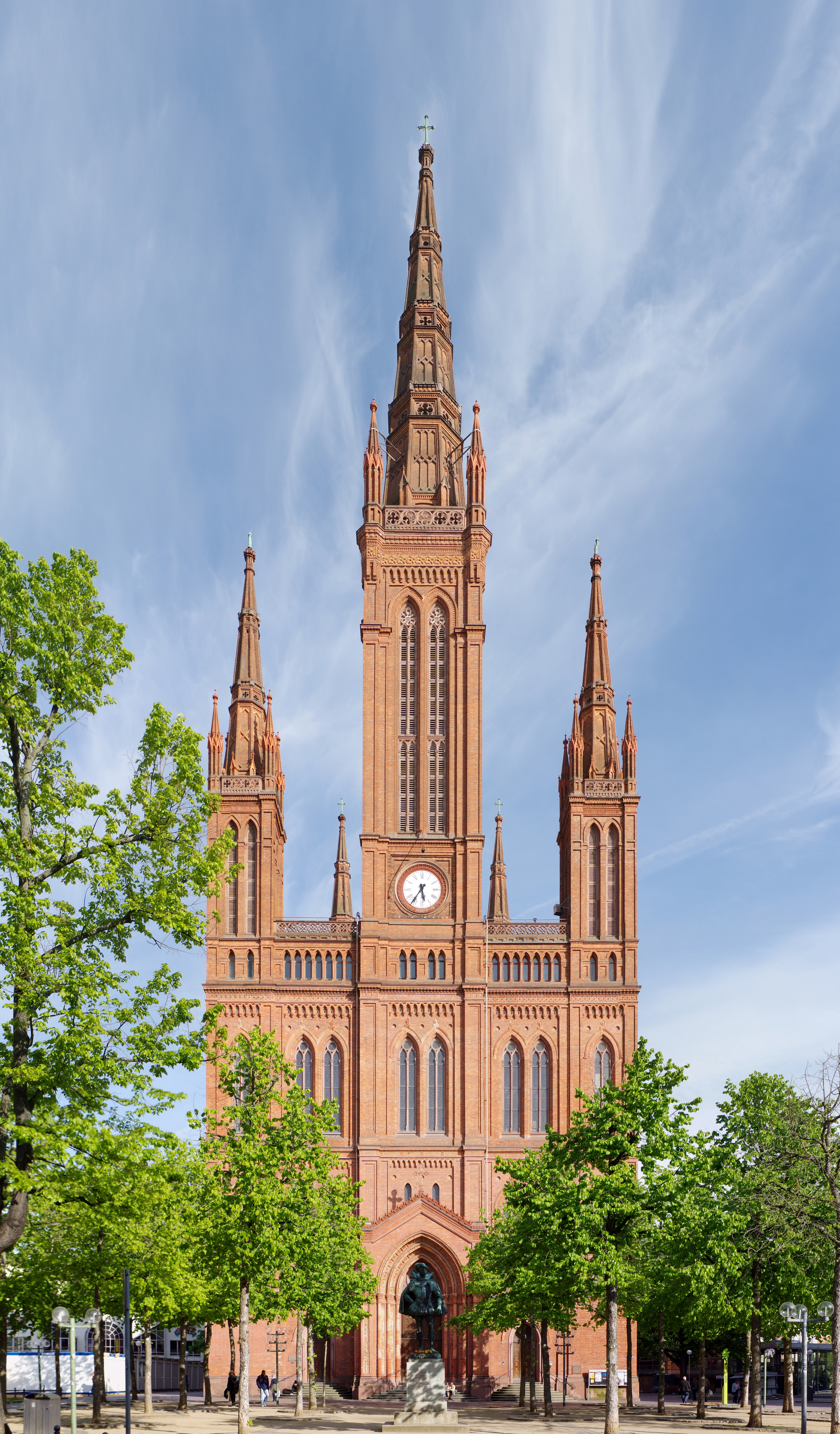
- Façade of Marktkirche, 2017
- Marktkirche
- 50°4′56″N 8°14′34″E
- Location: Wiesbaden, Hesse
- Country: Germany
- Denomination: Protestant
- Website: bonifatius-wiesbaden.de

History
- Status: Parish church
- Consecrated: 1862

Architecture
- Functional status: Active
- Architect: Carl Boos

Administration
- Diocese: Protestant Church in Hesse and Nassau

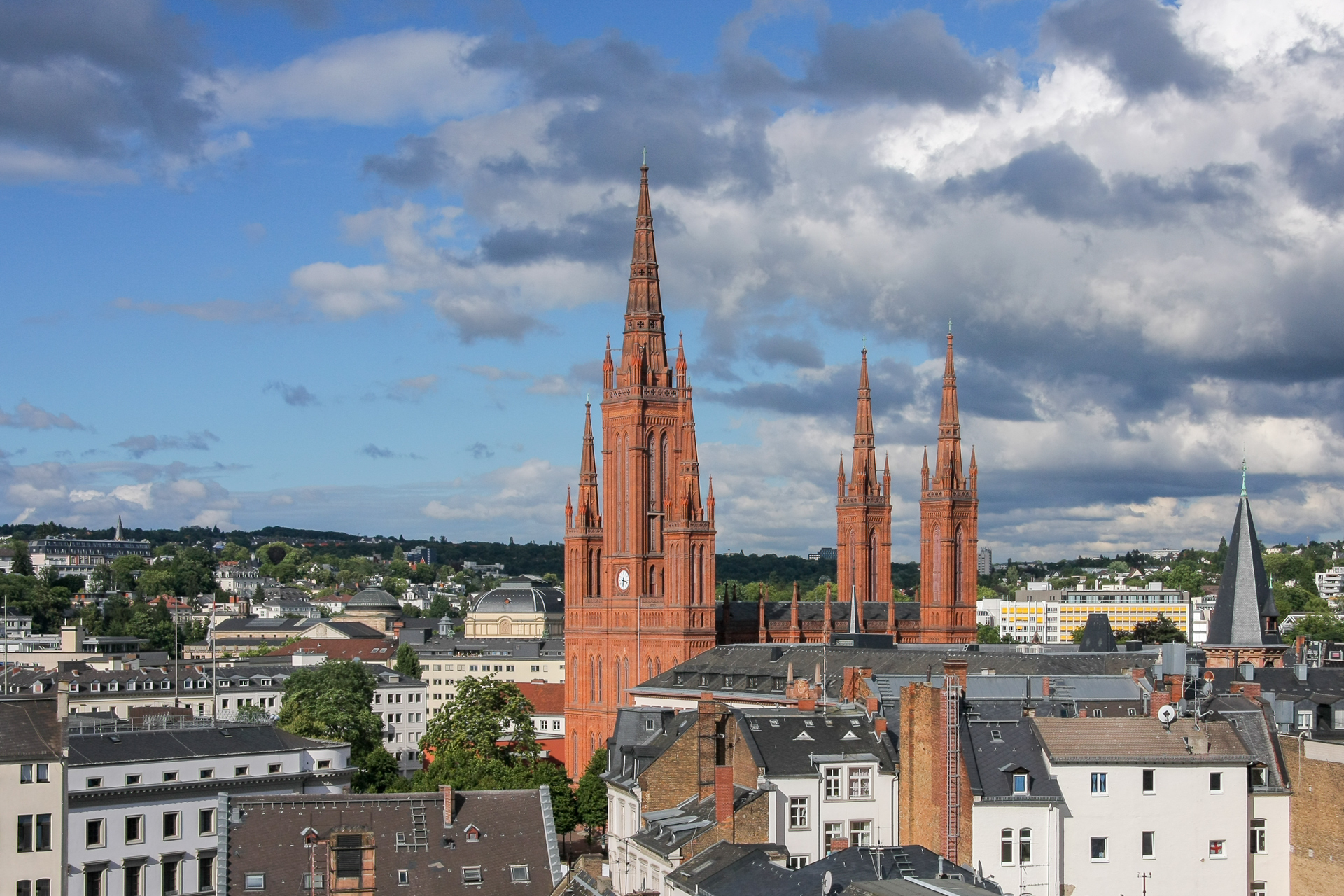
Panorama of the city center with Marktkirche

Marktkirche (Market Church) is the main Protestant church in Wiesbaden, the state capital of Hesse, Germany. The neo-Gothic church on the central Schlossplatz (English: Palace Square) was designed by Carl Boos and built between 1853 and 1862. At the time it was the largest brick building of the Duchy of Nassau. It is also called Nassauer Landesdom (Cathedral of Nassau).

== History ==
On 27 June 1850, Wiesbaden's main church, the medieval church of St. Mauritius, was destroyed in a fire. After a report showed that its remaining outer walls were not sufficiently stable, a new church was planned. On 26 January 1851, Carl Boos was appointed the architect. Boos submitted proposals for three locations, namely the old church site at the Mauritiusplatz, the central Schlossplatz facing the Stadtschloss Wiesbaden, and a site in the vineyards on the slopes of the Taunus.

Since the new building should reflect the need for representation of the Nassau residence and emerging spa destination, the site of the former church in the old city was rejected. The five ministers and the parish council preferred the location in the vineyards on the hill, so that the new church would be visible from a distance, but were overruled by six lay people who preferred a central location on the Schlossplatz. The Duke of Nassau made the property available for the construction, but did not sponsor the construction costs.

Carl Boos received the contract without a competition. On 14 January 1852, he presented first plans, but changed them on 25 February 1852, proposing a brick building based on the model of Karl Friedrich Schinkel's Friedrichswerder Church in Berlin. His unusual design with five towers was criticised because of needing too much material and building too high, but he even increased the height of the main tower to about 98 m (300 feet). The foundation stone was laid on 22 September 1853. When the church was completed it was the largest brick building of the Duchy of Nassau.

Ernst Ludwig Dietrich was minister from 1929 and served as Bishop of the Protestant Church in Hesse and Nassau from 1933 to 1945. His successor at the Marktkirche was from 1934 until his death in 1965 Willy Borngässer, who was arrested several times for his political views by the Nazis and imprisoned from 1943 to 1945. In 1937, Martin Niemöller, resistance fighter and honorary citizen of Wiesbaden, held his last sermon in the church before his arrest.

== Architecture ==
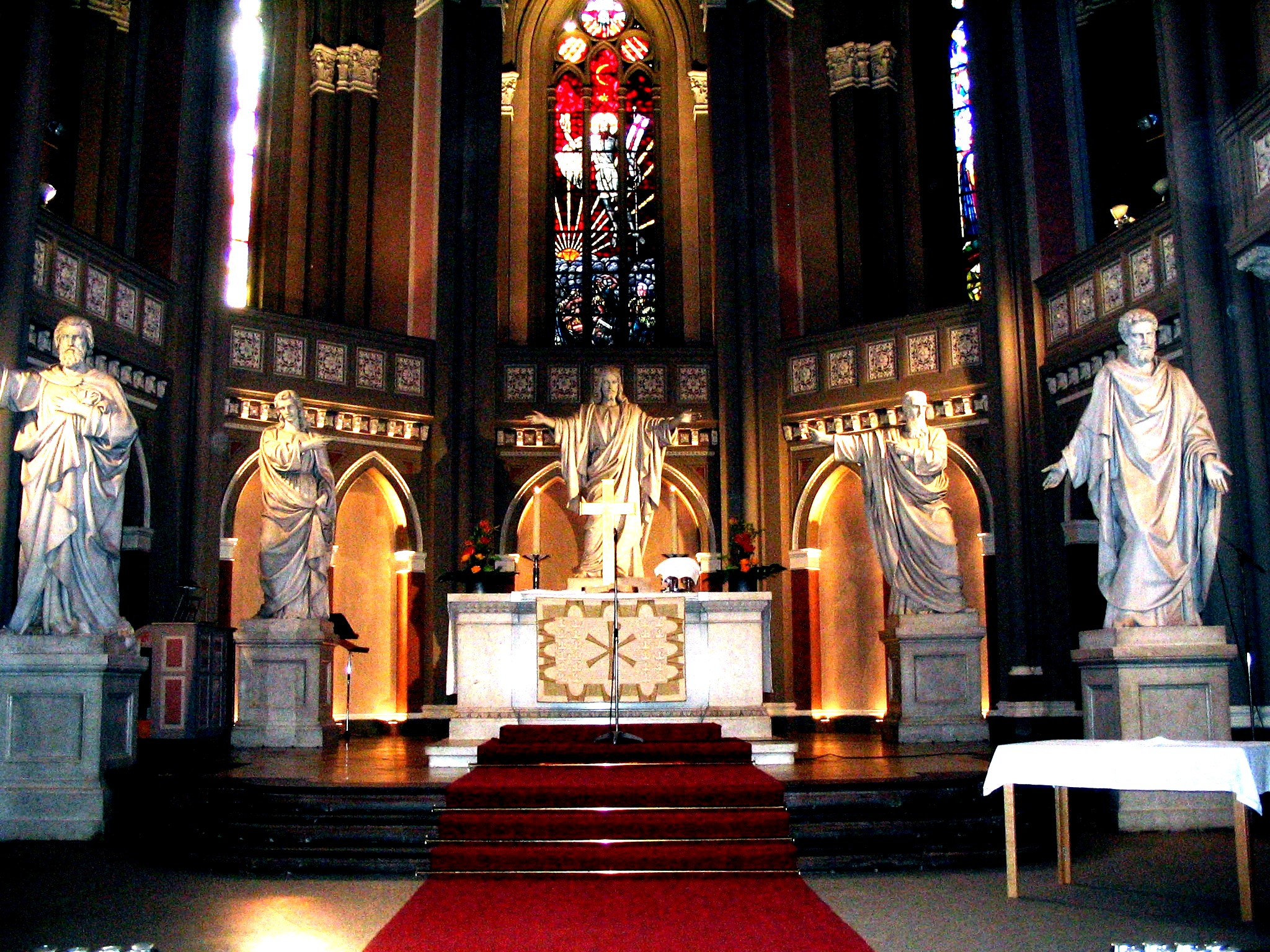
Christ and Evangelists by Emil Hopfgarten

The model of the church without transept was the Friedrichswerder Church. The Marktkirche was the first all-brick building in the Duchy of Nassau. The west tower makes it the tallest building in the city. The interior has a length of 50 m, a width of 20 m and a height of 28 m and is encircled by galleries. The vaulted ceiling is painted as a starry sky.

== Walcker organ ==
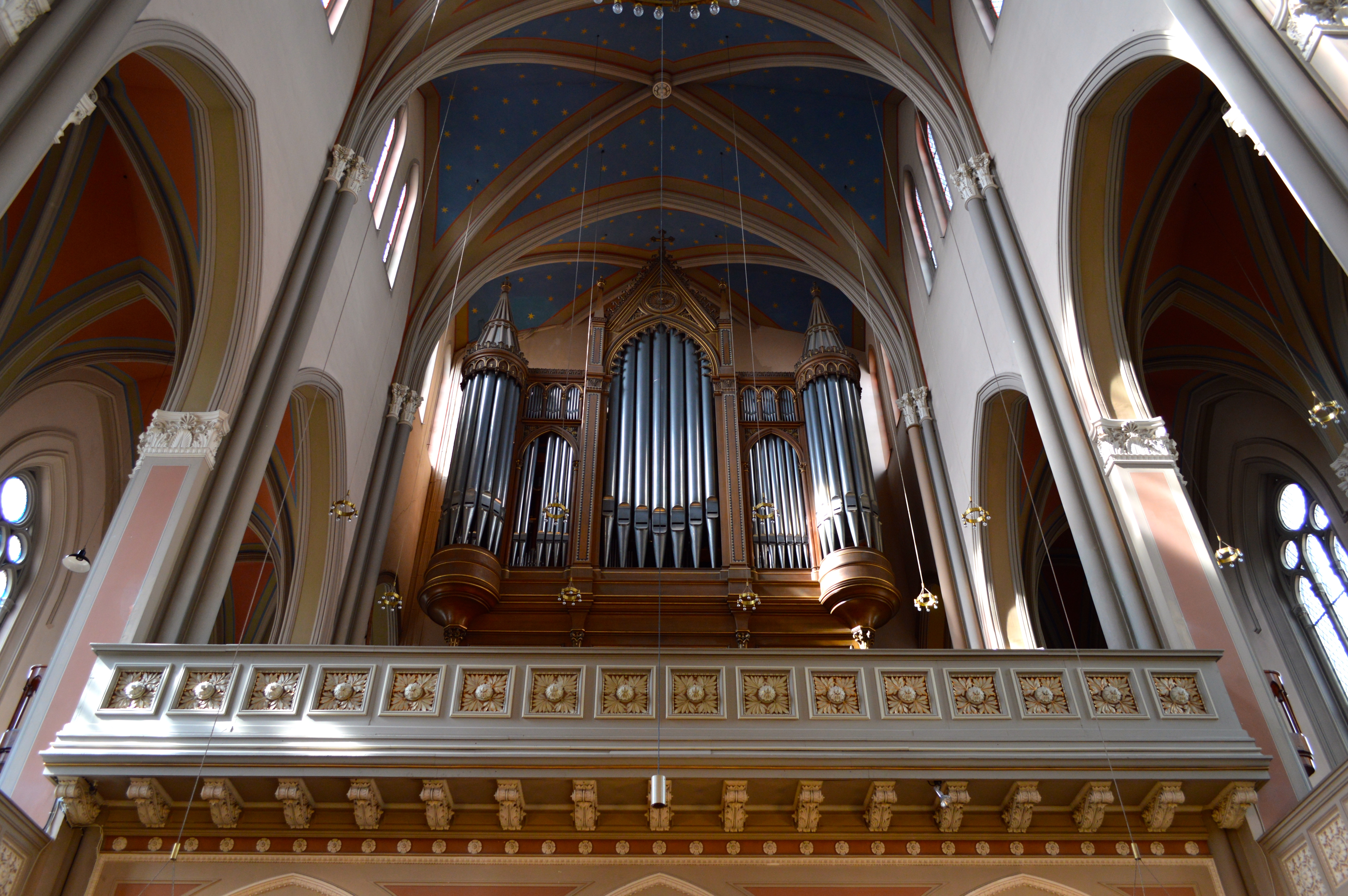
Marktkirche's Walcker Organ

The Walcker organ is considered to be important. The original organ was built in 1863 supplied by the company, Eberhard Friedrich Walcker from Ludwigsburg. It had 53 stops and a mechanical action. In 1900 the mechanical tracker action was replaced by a pneumatic action, in 1929 by an electro-pneumatic action, and finally in 1970 (Gebr. Oberlinger, Windesheim) by an electric organ with play and stop action.

The last renovation and expansion dates from 1982, when it was expanded to 85 registers (on slider chests), 20 of which date back to the original organ of 1863. The instrument has a total of 6,198 pipes. The main console was built in 1982 and is designed like the French Cavaillé-Coll organs. The choir organ can be played from the main console.

== Carillon ==
The Marktkirche has a carillon, installed in the main tower about 65 m high. The mechanical keyboard is reached by stairs of 290 steps. The carillon, the largest in Hesse, consists of 49 bronze bells. The biggest one weighs 2.2 tons, the smallest 13 kg. All bells including the steel structure housing them weigh 11 tons. The carillon was inaugurated on Reformation Day, 31 October 1986. It was financed by the parish, the city and many donations. It can be played manually and is played automatically at regular times every day.

== Church music ==
Between 1890 and 1896, the composer, pianist and organist Max Reger played during his time in Wiesbaden on the Walcker organ of the church. An organ version of his Hebbel-Requiem by the Munich organist and composer Max Beckschäfer was premiered at the church in 1985 by the Reger-Chor, conducted by Gabriel Dessauer.

Current organists are Hans Uwe Hielscher (since 1979) and Thomas J. Frank. Frank is also the conductor of the church choir and a project choir for performances of oratorios. Hielscher initiated a series "Orgelmusik zur Marktzeit" (organ music at market time), half an hour of organ music every Saturday at 11:30 am, played by himself and guests. He played the 1500th concert in 2010.

The church has been a venue of the Rheingau Musik Festival, beginning in its first season with a concert of the Dresdner Kreuzchor. It is also one of the locations for the series, begun in 2004, to perform all Bach sacred cantatas as part of monthly services in a collaboration of the Schiersteiner Kantorei, the Kantorei St. Katharinen Frankfurt and the Hochschule für Musik und Darstellende Kunst Frankfurt. In 2009 the Schiersteiner Kantorei, conducted by Martin Lutz, performed Handel's Solomon with Andreas Scholl in the title role, tenor Andreas Karasiak and bass Gotthold Schwarz.

== Gallery ==
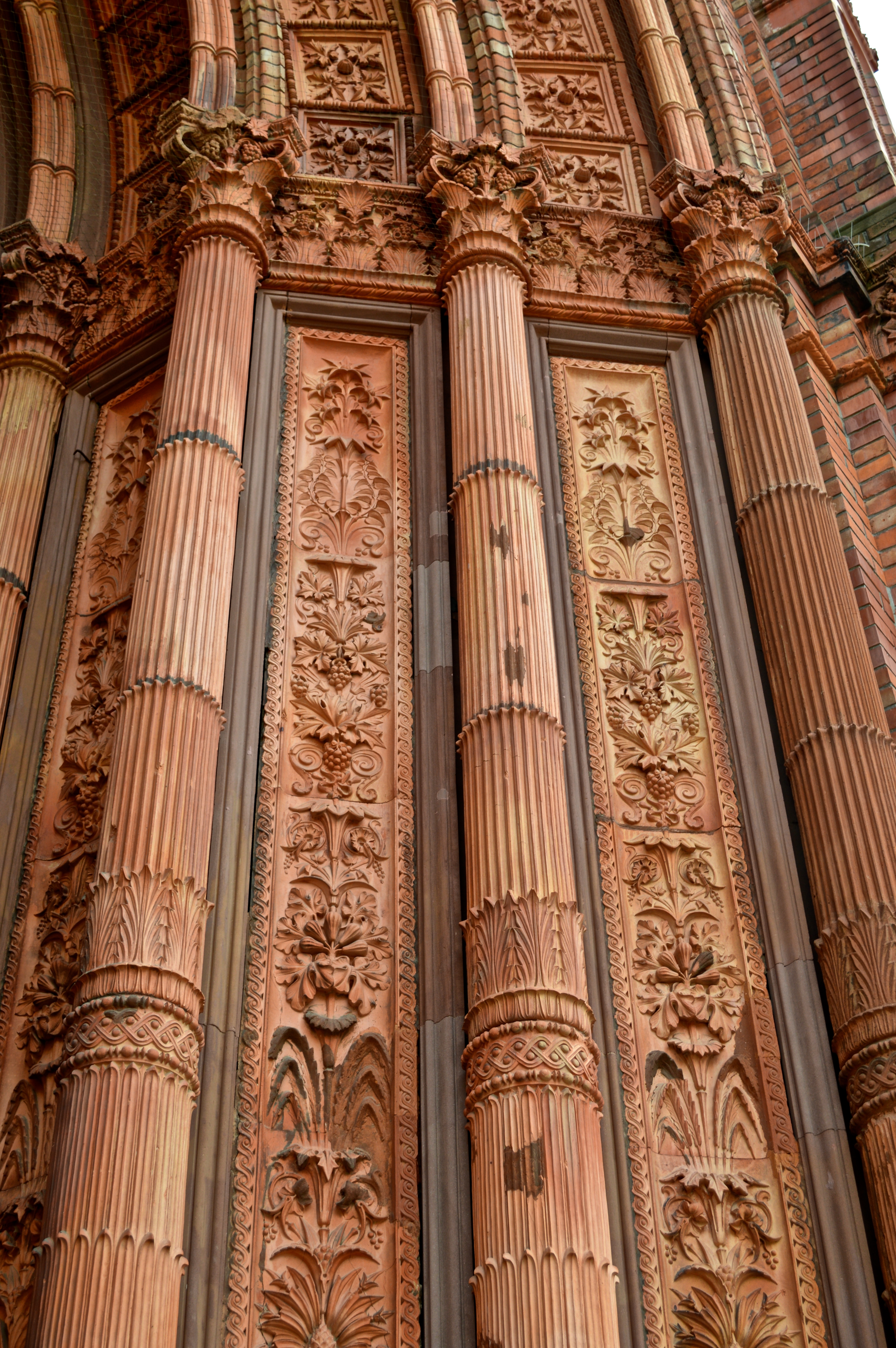
Detail at the main portal

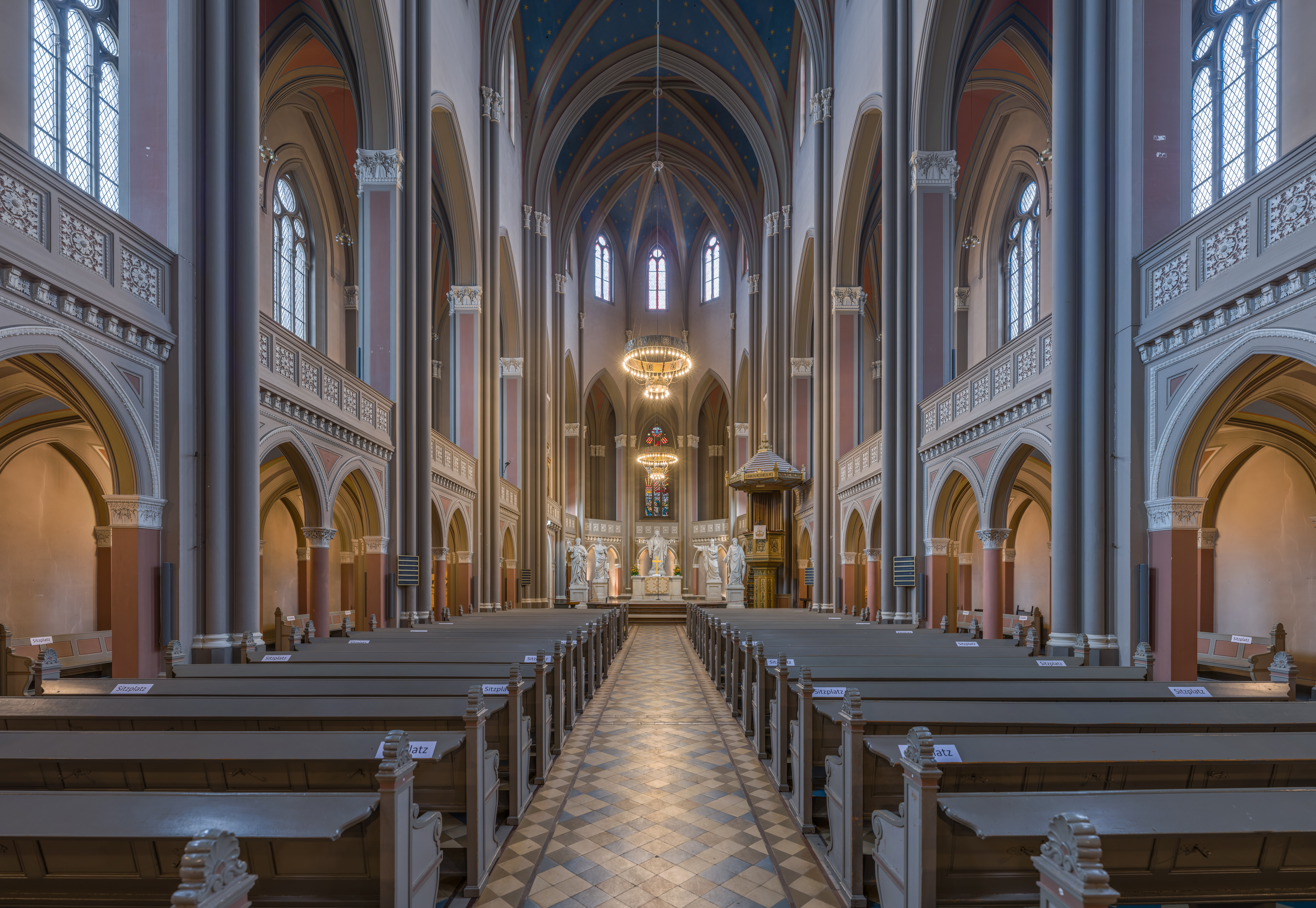
Looking down the nave, towards the altar

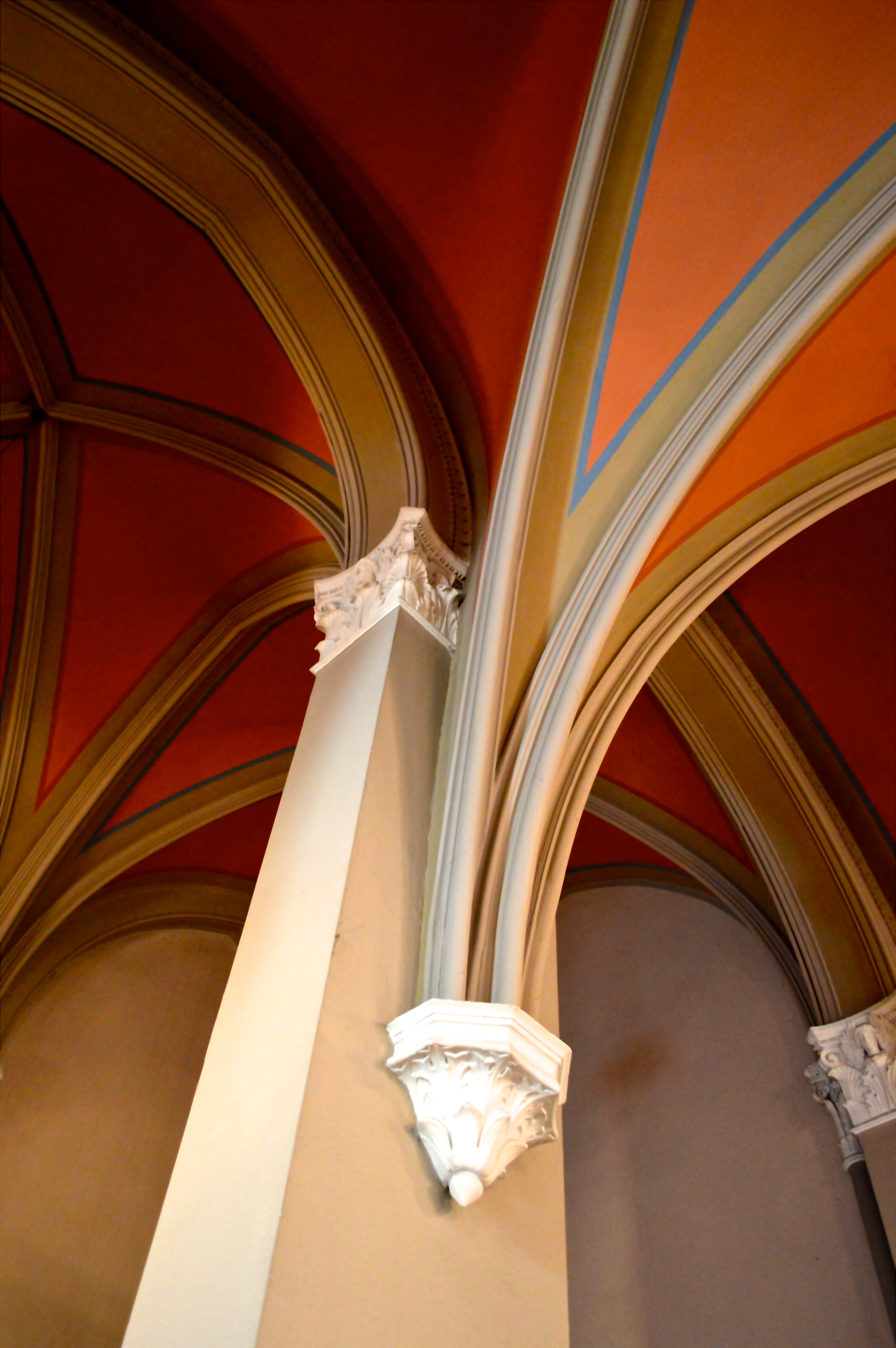
Vaults meet a column
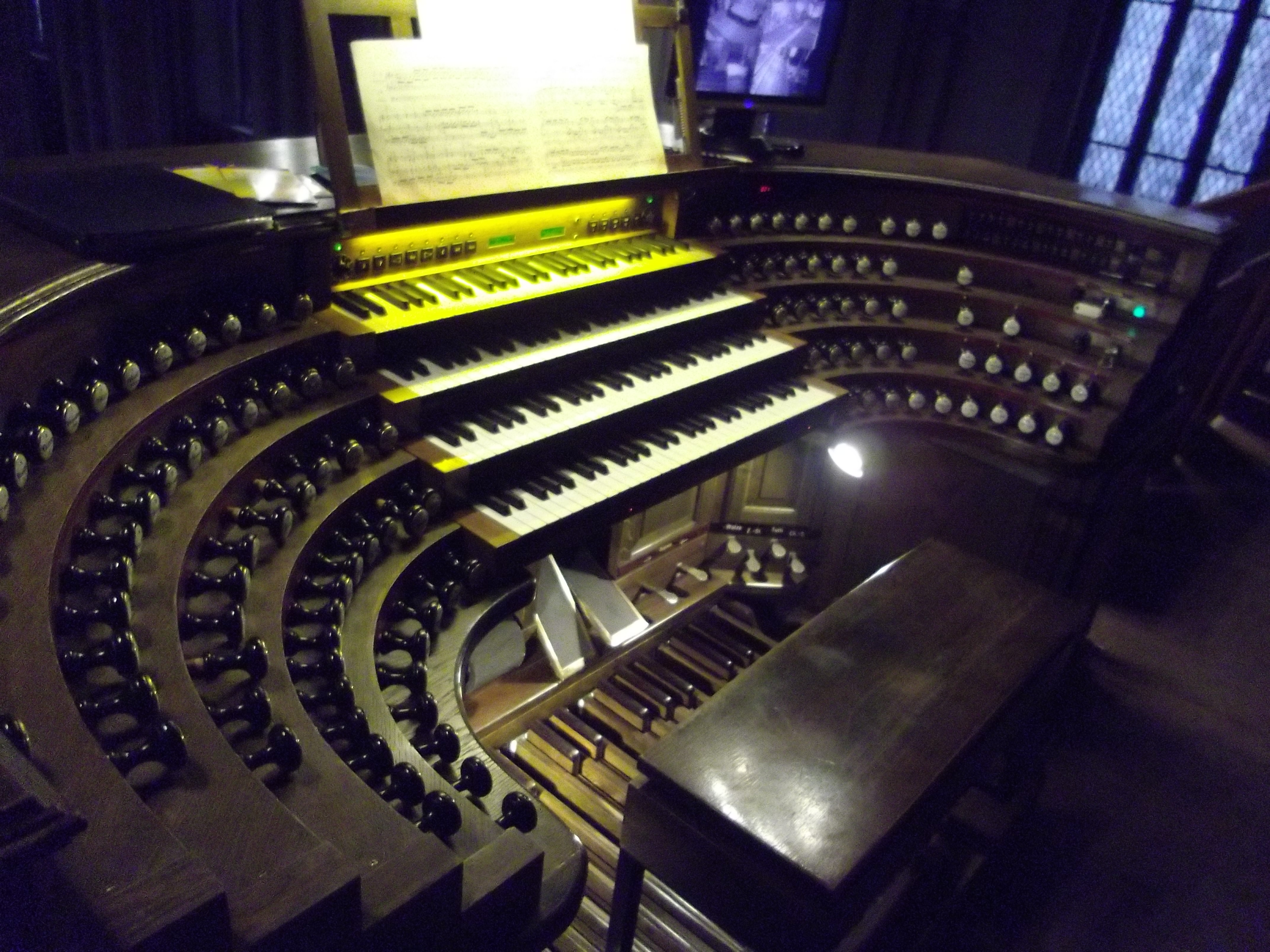
Console of the Walcker organ

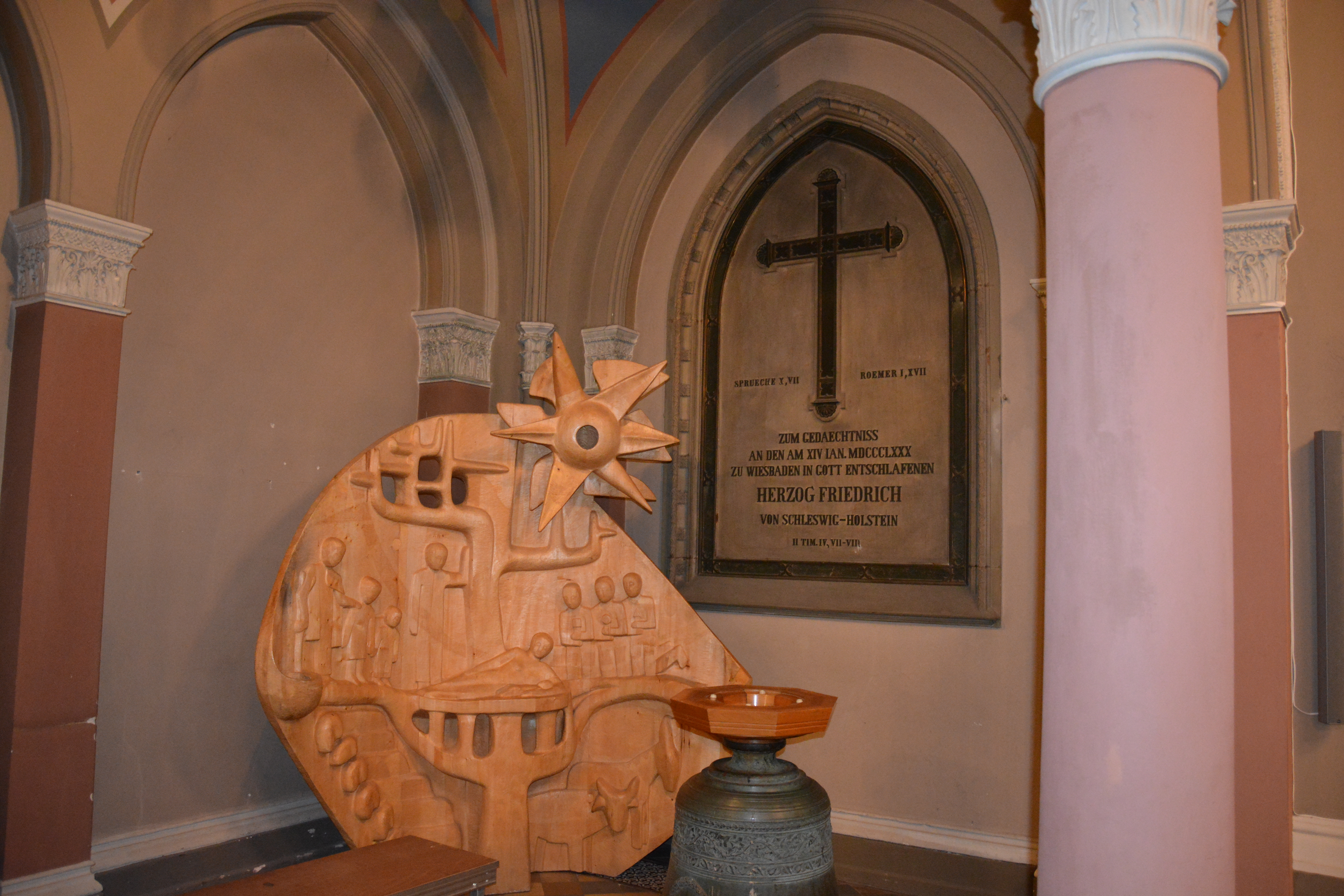

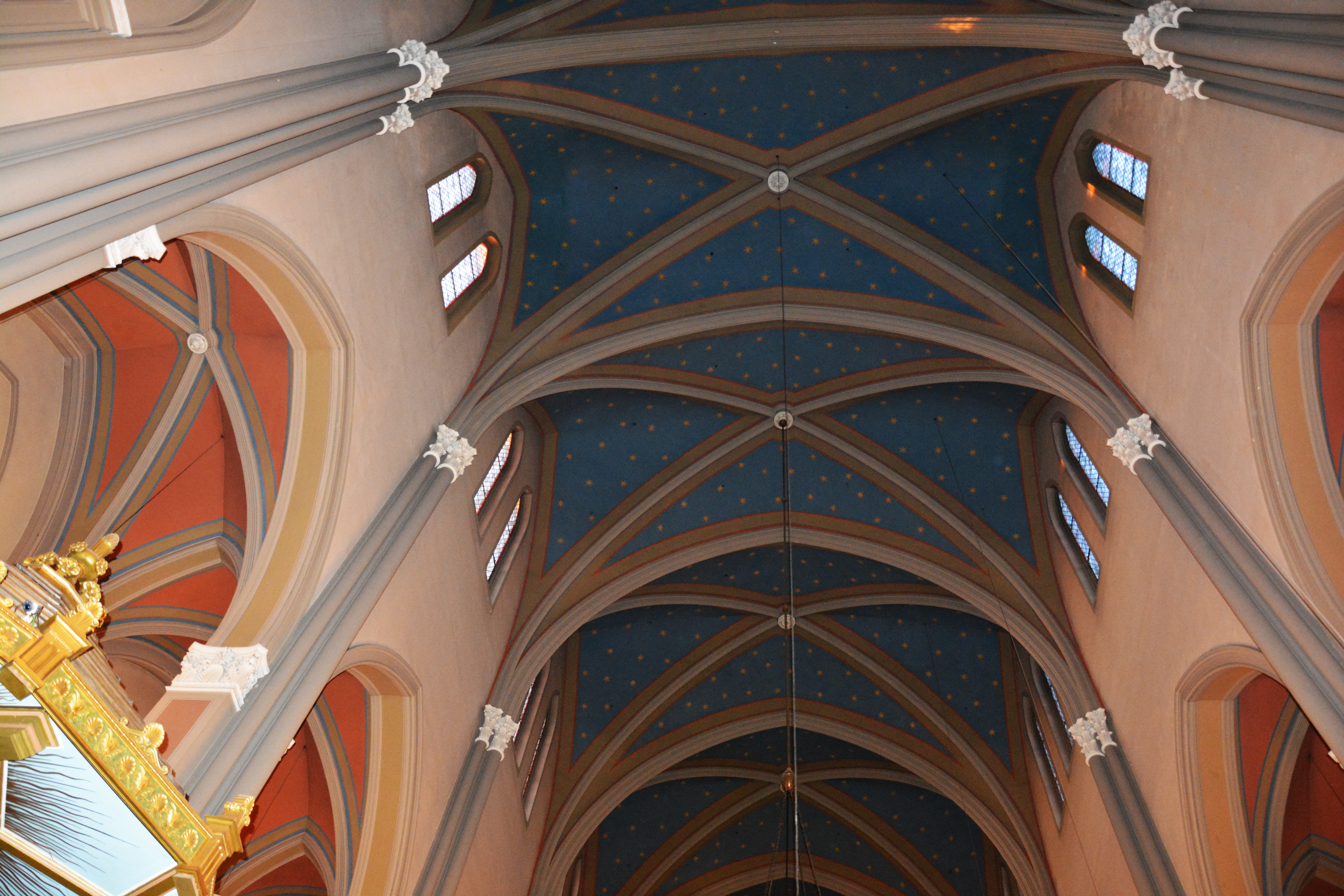

A stained glass window
