= Schiersteiner Kantorei =

German choir

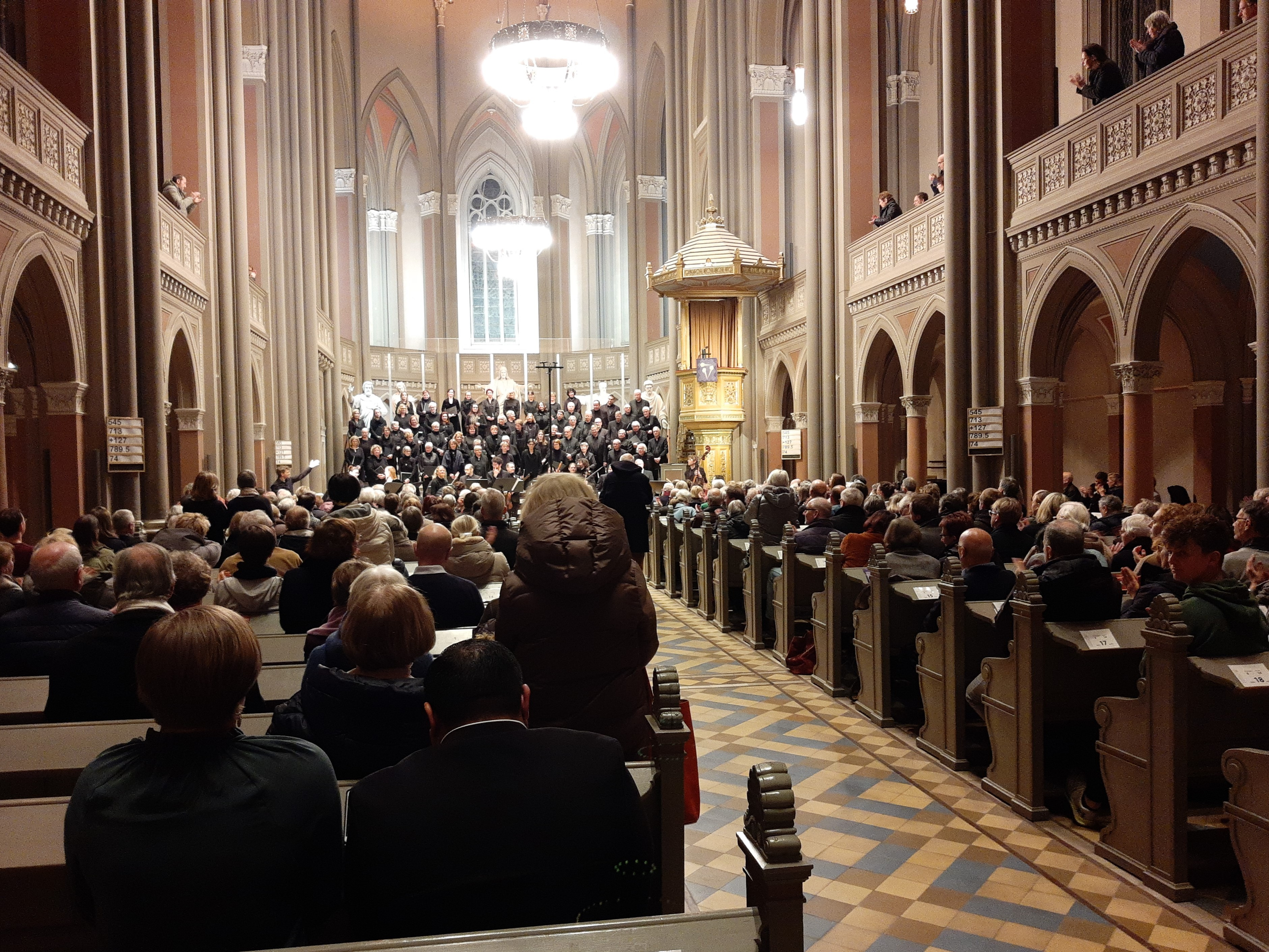
Schiersteiner Kantorei in Marktkirche, Wiesbaden. Conducted by Clemens Bosselmann. (March 2023)

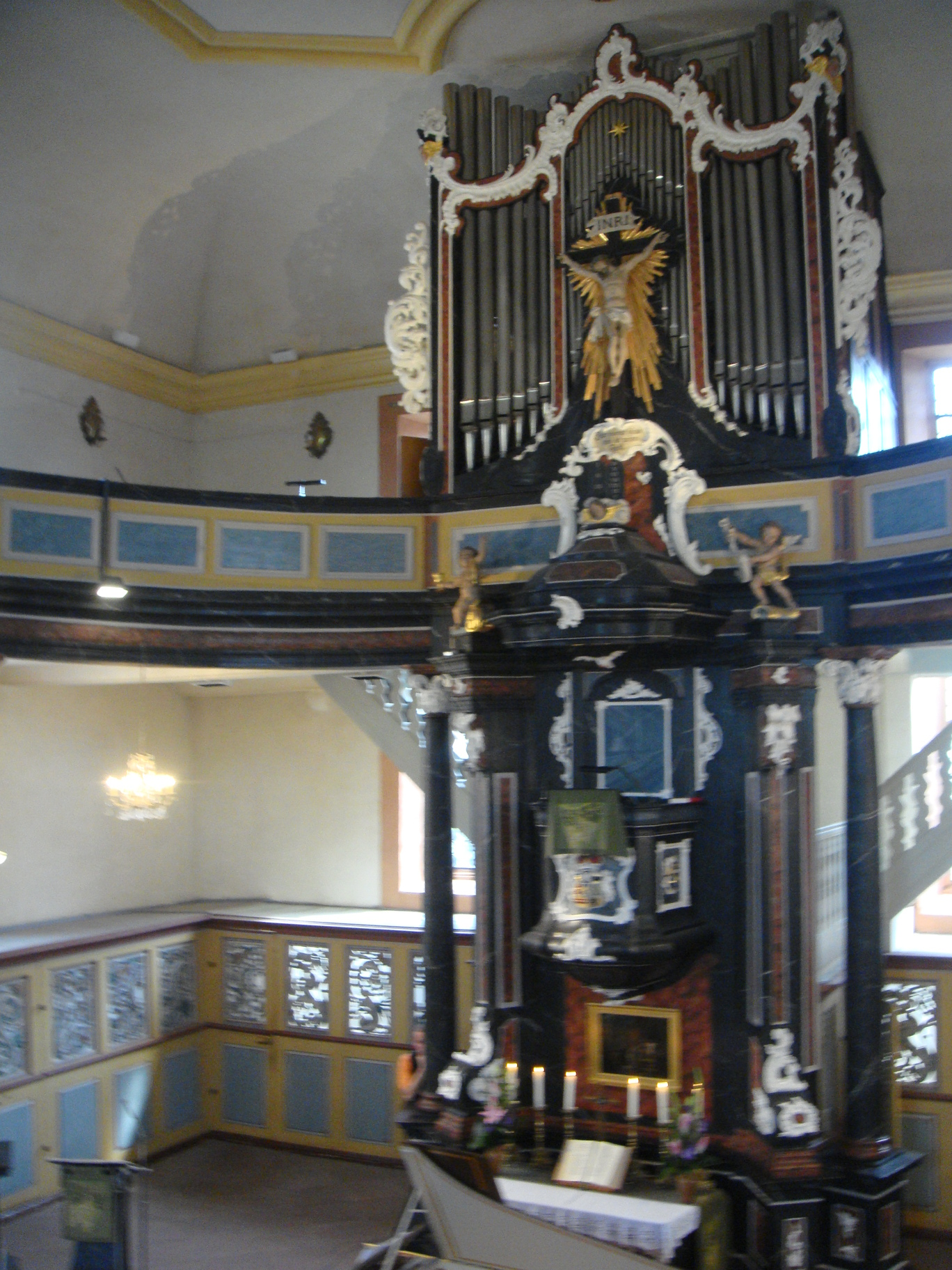
Christophoruskirche, Schierstein

Schiersteiner Kantorei (Schierstein Chorale) is a German concert choir, founded in 1962 at the Christophoruskirche in Wiesbaden-Schierstein. The choir performs regularly in the Marktkirche, Wiesbaden, and in Eberbach Abbey. It is known internationally through its tours and recordings. The choir was awarded the Culture Prize of the City of Wiesbaden in 1990.

== History ==
The Schiersteiner choir was founded in 1962 by Johannes Krüger, then cantor at the Christophoruskirche. Since 1972, the choir has been directed by Professor Martin Lutz, who shaped the group of some 40 singers to a large concert choir. Schiersteiner Kantorei performs regularly in the Marktkirche, Wiesbaden, and in Eberbach Abbey, and has conducted tours to England, France, Portugal, and Switzerland. The choir was awarded the Culture Prize of the City of Wiesbaden in 1990. As of 2012, the choir's 50th year, it has about 130 singers. Smaller subgroups perform chamber works.

== Repertoire ==
Marktkirche, Wiesbaden

The core work of the choir is based on Johann Sebastian Bach and George Frideric Handel. In addition, most major oratorios and choral works as well as a variety of a cappella pieces are part of the choir's repertoire. Major works are regularly performed in the Marktkirche, Wiesbaden, and in Eberbach Abbey. The orchestra is the Bach Ensemble Wiesbaden, formed by leading musicians of orchestras in the Rhine-Main area. Works of Viennese Classicism and Romanticism are presented in historically informed performance.

Since 2004, the choir has been part of a project to perform all Bach sacred cantatas as part of monthly services, introduced by a lecture. The services are held at both the Marktkirche and the Katharinenkirche, Frankfurt, in a collaboration with the Kantorei St. Katharinen and the Hochschule für Musik und Darstellende Kunst Frankfurt.

Recordings have included Bach's St John Passion (2003) and St Matthew Passion (2006), with Christoph Prégardien as the Evangelist, Konrad Jarnot and Klaus Mertens as the Vox Christi, soprano Siri Thornhill, alto Matthias Rexroth and bass Markus Flaig. In 2009, the choir performed Handel's Solomon at the Marktkirche with Andreas Scholl in the title role, tenor Andreas Karasiak and bass Gotthold Schwarz. In its 50th year, the choir performed Bach's St Matthew Passion in the Marktkirche on 31 March 2012.
