= Bonthapally =

- Census Town
- Location in Telangana, India Bonthapally (India)
- Coordinates: 17°39′45″N 78°22′0″E
- Country: India
- State: Telangana
- District: Sangareddy

Area
  - Total: 9.30 km^{2} (3.59 sq mi)

Population (2011)
  - Total: 6,608
  - Density: 711/km^{2} (1,840/sq mi)

Languages
  - Official: Telugu
- Time zone: UTC+5:30 (IST)
- Postal code: 502313
- Vehicle registration: TS 15
- Website: telangana.gov.in

Bonthapally is a census town in Sangareddy district of the Indian state of Telangana. It is famous for the Veerabhadra Swamy temple. Many pharmaceutical companies are established in the town like Hetero Drugs, Neuland Laboratories, Granules India and Honour Lab, as well as precision engineering company Sundram Fasteners.

== Accessibility ==
Bonthapally is 35 km from Hyderabad and can be reached by buses.

== Neighborhoods ==
- Gummadidala
- Annaram
- Domadugu
- Dundigal
