= Domadugu =

- Census Town
- Location in Telangana, India Domadugu (India)
- Coordinates: 17°39′31″N 78°22′26″E
- Country: India
- State: Telangana
- District: Sangareddy

Area
  - Total: 5.20 km^{2} (2.01 sq mi)

Population (2011)
  - Total: 4,183
  - Density: 804/km^{2} (2,080/sq mi)

Languages
  - Official: Telugu
- Time zone: UTC+5:30 (IST)
- Postal code: 502313
- Vehicle registration: TS 15
- Website: telangana.gov.in

Domadugu is a census town in Sangareddy district of the Indian state of Telangana.

== Geography ==
It is located at 17°39′31″N 78°22′26″E.

== Accessibility ==
Domadugu is 37 km from Hyderabad and can be reached by TSRTC buses.

== Neighborhoods ==
Gummadidala, Annaram, Bonthapally, Dundigal
