= Kaspar Kögler =

German painter

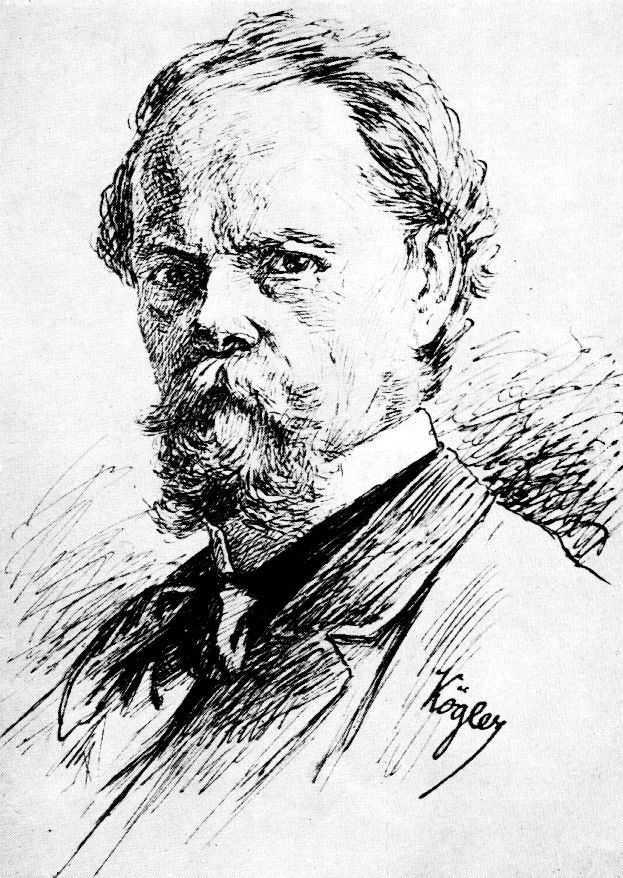
Self-portrait of Kaspar Kögler

Kaspar Kögler (12 February 1838 – 1 April 1923) was a German painter, illustrator and writer.

== Life and work ==
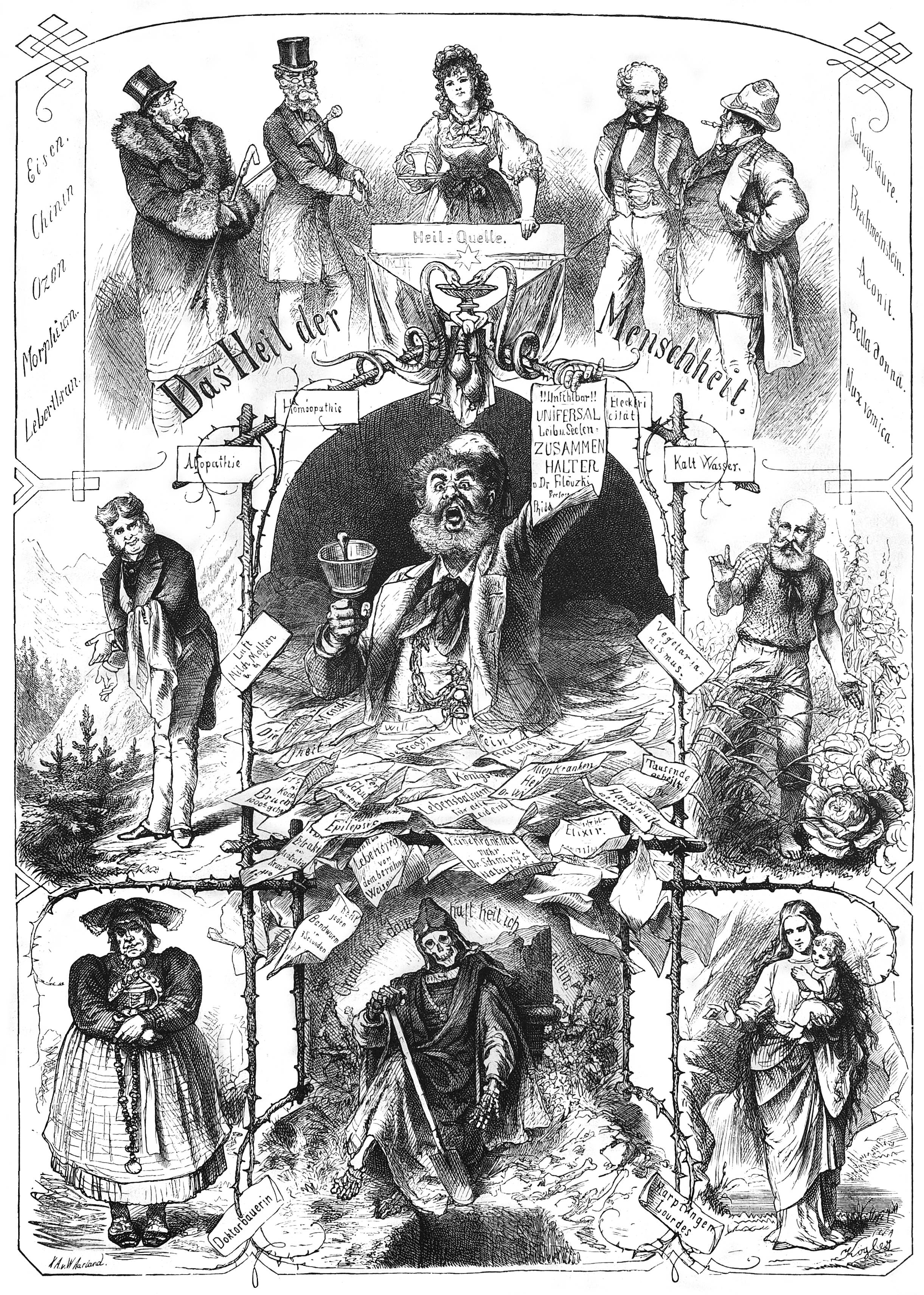
The Salvation of Humanity, from Die Gartenlaube (1878)

He was the fourth of eight children born to a farming family. Originally, their name was spelled Kegeler or Kegler. As the eldest son, he was expected to succeed his father, but he displayed a degree of artistic talent that led him on a different career path.

His training, which was supported by the Walderdorff family, began with lessons from Leonhard Diefenbach, at the trade school in Hadamar. From 1856 to 1861, he studied at the Academy of Fine Arts, Munich, with Moritz von Schwind and Josef Bernhardt, among others. He left Munich before completing his studies, and worked as an itinerant church painter in the areas around Vorarlberg, Liechtenstein and Graubünden.

In 1867, when he arrived at the newly fashionable and growing spa town of Wiesbaden, he settled down to become a portrait painter. He also operated a small painting and drawing school. His most successful student there was Heinrich Schlitt.

He also began working as an illustrator, initially with several popular family magazines such as Über Land und Meer, the Fliegende Blätter and Die Gartenlaube. Later, he illustrated books, including Alemannische Gedichte by Johann Peter Hebel, Deutscher Dichterwald by Georg Scherer, and Der erste Ball by Johannes Trojan. He occasionally wrote poetry and short prose works himself, under the pseudonym, "Karl Kurzum" (Karl in Short).

As his reputation grew, he was commissioned to do decorative works. One of his first involved frescoes at the Ratskeller in the New Town hall (1890), where he created humorous scenes with texts. A particularly notable assignment involved decorations at the Hessisches Staatstheater (1894), for which he was awarded the Order of the Red Eagle by Kaiser Wilhelm II.

He was married to Ida Bogler (1853–1931), a cousin of the architect, Wilhelm Bogler, with whom Kögler associated for many years. They had a daughter, who died young, and a son who became an engineer. In turn, Bogler was married to Kögler's sister, Anna Maria.

In 1908, on the occasion of his seventieth birthday, a forest path was named after him. It runs along the north side of Wiesbaden, from the Neroberg to Rabengrund. A street in Molsberg, near his birthplace, is also named after him. In 2004, a plaza with a fountain in Wiesbaden-Mitte was renamed the "Kaspar-Kögler-Platz".
