= Hartwig =

Hartwig may refer to:

- Hartwig (given name)
- Hartwig (surname)
- Hartwig (lunar crater)
- Hartwig (Martian crater)
