= Hartwich =

Hartwich is a German surname. Notable people with this surname include the following:

- Daniel Hartwich (born 1978), German television presenter and game show host
- Emil Hartwich (1843–1886), German judge, killed in a duel over an adulterous affair, which inspired Fontane's novel Effi Briest
- Herman Hartwich (1853–1926), German-American landscape and genre painter
- Iwona Hartwich (born 1970), Polish politician
- Johann Hartwich, Austrian table tennis player
- Bo Hartwich, (born 1975) Danish-American writer under the writers name B. B. Hartwich.
- Oliver Marc Hartwich (born 1975), German economist and media commentator
- Wilhelm Karl Hartwich Peters (1815–1883), German naturalist and explorer

== See also ==
- Hartwig (surname)
