= Pakhal =

Pakhal may refer to:

- Pakhal Lake in Telangana, India
- Pakhal Sarkar, a populated places in Pakistan
- Pakhal Tirumal Reddy, Indian artist
- Pakhala, Indian food from Odisha state
