= Granules India =

Indian pharmaceutical company

Granules India Ltd.

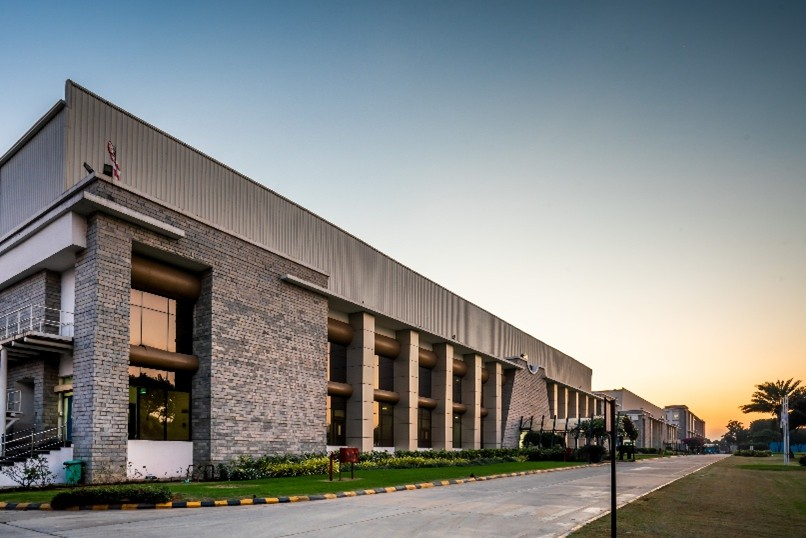
- Granules Finished Dosage unit in Gagillapur
- Type: Public
- Traded as: BSE: 532482; NSE: GRANULES
- Industry: Pharmaceuticals
- Founded: 1984
- Founder: Krishna Prasad Chigurupati
- Headquarters: Hyderabad, Telangana, India
- Area served: Worldwide
- Key people: Krishna Prasad Chigurupati (CMD); Uma Devi Chigurupati (ED); Priyanka Chigurupati (ED); Harsha Chigurupati (ED)
- Products: Finished Dosages; Pharmaceutical Formulation Intermediates; Active Pharmaceutical Ingredients; Peptides/CDMO
- Revenue: ▼₹4,481.6 crore (US$470 million) (FY 2024-25)
- Operating income: ▼₹856 crore (US$89 million) (FY24)
- Net income: ▼₹501.5 crore (US$52 million) (FY 2024-25)
- Number of employees: 6,166 (March 2025)
- Subsidiaries: Granules Pharmaceuticals Inc.; Granules Life Sciences Private Limited; Granules CZRO Private Limited; Ascelis Peptides Private Limited.
- Website: granulesindia.com

Granules India Limited is an Indian pharmaceutical manufacturing company headquartered in Hyderabad, Telangana, India. The company is involved in the manufacture and sale of finished dosage forms (FDs), pharmaceutical formulation intermediates (PFIs), active pharmaceutical ingredients (APIs).

Granules manufactures off-patent pharmaceutical products at large scale for customers in regulated and other international markets.

The company is among the larger global manufacturers of first-line therapeutic products, including paracetamol, metformin, ibuprofen, guaifenesin, and methocarbamol.

The company manufactures pharmaceutical products across multiple therapeutic categories, including antihistamines, anti-gout agents, anti-thrombocytopenic agents, anti-diabetic drugs, central nervous system (CNS) treatments, oncology products, and mineral supplements. In 2025 company also entered the peptides segment through the establishment of its subsidiary, Ascelis Peptides Private Limited.

== History ==
Granules India was founded in 1984 as Triton Laboratories Private Limited by Krishna Prasad Chigurupati and Uma Chigurupati in Hyderabad, India. The company initially focused on the manufacture of paracetamol active pharmaceutical ingredients (APIs) at its Bonthapally facility, located on the outskirts of Hyderabad.

In 1987, Triton became the second Indian pharmaceutical company to export products to the United States, marking an early milestone in its international expansion.

1990-2000

During the 1990s, the company expanded its manufacturing capabilities.

In 1990, it established a second production facility in Jeedimetla to manufacture multiple APIs. As part of its differentiation strategy, Triton pioneered the production and sale of bulk granulated paracetamol, commonly referred to as direct compressible (DC) grade material or pharmaceutical formulation intermediates (PFIs).

In 1991, Granules India Private Limited was formally incorporated as a merchant exporter of bulk drugs.

In 1993, the company established its first pharmaceutical formulation intermediates (PFI) facility at Jeedimetla, applying the PFI concept to multiple active pharmaceutical ingredients (APIs), and began exporting to international markets including the United States, Germany, and Australia.

Granules became a public company in 1993 and was listed following its initial public offering on the Hyderabad Stock Exchange in 1995.

2000 -2010

In 2001, Triton Laboratories merged with Granules India, consolidating operations under a single corporate entity.

In 2003, Granules commissioned what it described as the world’s largest single-site PFI manufacturing facility at Gagillapur. In the same year, the company established Granules US, a wholly owned subsidiary, to support marketing and distribution activities in the United States.

In 2002, Granules India was listed on the Bombay Stock Exchange (BSE), followed by a listing on the National Stock Exchange (NSE) in 2005. During this period, the company commissioned a new paracetamol manufacturing plant at Bonthapally, expanding its active pharmaceutical ingredient (API) production capacity.

2008-2020

In 2008, Granules entered the finished dosage formulations segment, diversifying its business beyond APIs and pharmaceutical formulation intermediates (PFIs). The company received approval from the U.S. Food and Drug Administration (FDA) for its first Abbreviated New Drug Application (ANDA) in 2010.

In 2013, Granules India acquired Auctus Pharma Laboratories, an API manufacturing facility with regulatory approvals, and established an API research and development centre at Pragathi Nagar, Hyderabad.

In 2014, the company set up Granules Pharmaceuticals Inc., a wholly owned subsidiary in the United States, to focus on formulation research and development and forward integration.

In 2015, Granules entered the U.S. over-the-counter (OTC) segment through Granules Consumer Healthcare.

In 2016, Granules commissioned a manufacturing facility at Visakhapatnam with capabilities for oncology and high-potency APIs, expanding into specialised therapeutic areas.

In 2019, the company entered the front-end prescription drug business in the United States under the GPI label, marking its move into direct pharmaceutical sales.

2021 - 2025

In 2021, Granules laid the foundation for a large-scale Multi-Unit Pellet System (MUPS) manufacturing facility, aimed at supporting advanced drug delivery technologies.

In 2023, Granules entered into a strategic partnership with Greenko ZeroC to enable decarbonisation, advancing its sustainability initiatives.

In 2024, Granules Life Sciences (GLS) commenced operations with a planned finished dosage capacity of ten billion units annually, and the Granules CZRO pilot plant also became operational.

In 2025, Granules acquired Senn Chemicals AG, a Switzerland-based contract development and manufacturing organisation (CDMO) specialising in peptide development and manufacturing, through its wholly owned subsidiary Ascelis Peptides Private Limited.

== Infrastructure ==
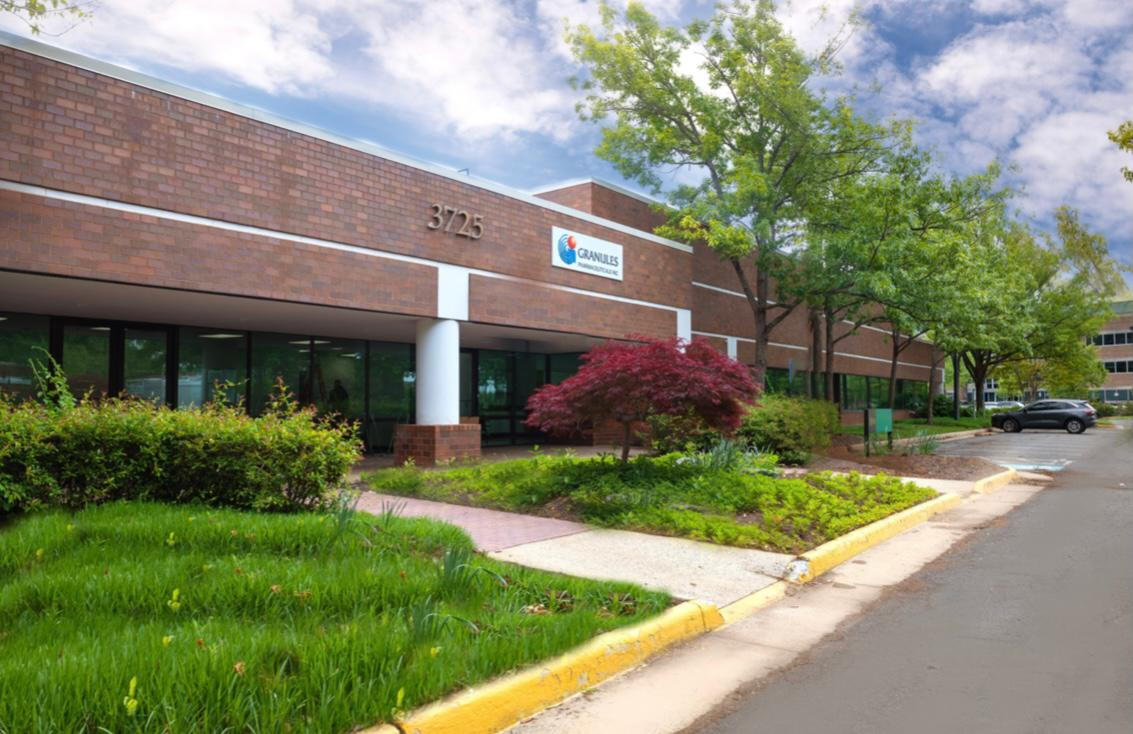
Granules Pharmaceuticals, Inc. in Chantilly, Virginia, US

Granules has 10 manufacturing facilities out of which seven are in India, two in the US and one in Switzerland. The Company has eight research centers, one in Pune, five in Hyderabad, one in Switzerland and one in the US.

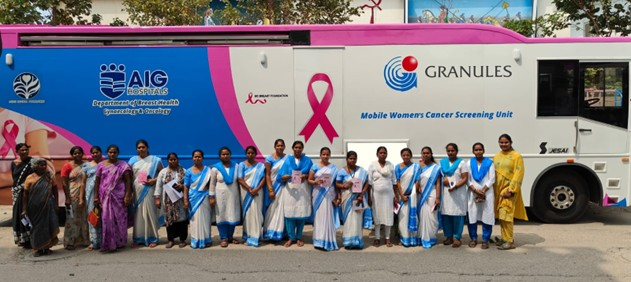
Breast Health Express mobile cancer screening unit by Granules

== See also ==
- Pharmaceutical industry in India
