= Mahirwan Mamtani =

German painter (born 1935)

Mahirwan Mamtani (born 2 November 1935 in Bhiria (Nawabshah) Sindh, British India) is painter, graphic and multimedia artist.

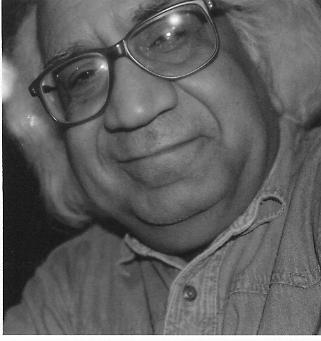
Mahirwan Mamtani

Mamtani grew up in India, studied there and moved 1966 to Germany, where he had been awarded a scholarship by DAAD (German Academic Exchange Service) to study painting at the Kunstakademie. Since that time he lives and works in and around Munich.

== Early years ==
Already at the age of six in Sindh, Mahirwan Mamtani began to paint, mainly with charcoal and chalks on walls. At the age of 12, due to the partition of India, in 1947 the family moved to Delhi. Because of miserable living conditions as a refugee, lying on sick bed he taught himself without proper schooling. He used to doodle with pencil or pastels on paper. However circumstances forced Mamtani to earn money doing several jobs and his urge to paint was suppressed due to lack of time and money. After some years of such conditions, loneliness and hard work at self-education, Mamtani besides his jobs started studying for Bachelor of Arts and then joined evening classes at the Fine Arts Department of Delhi Polytechnic to study painting. He obtained the National Diploma in 1962. In 1966 he was awarded a scholarship by German Academic Exchange Service (DAAD) to study painting at the Academy of Fine Arts Munich under Prof. Franz Nagel. Since then he is living with his family in and around the Munich and Bavaria area.

== Career ==
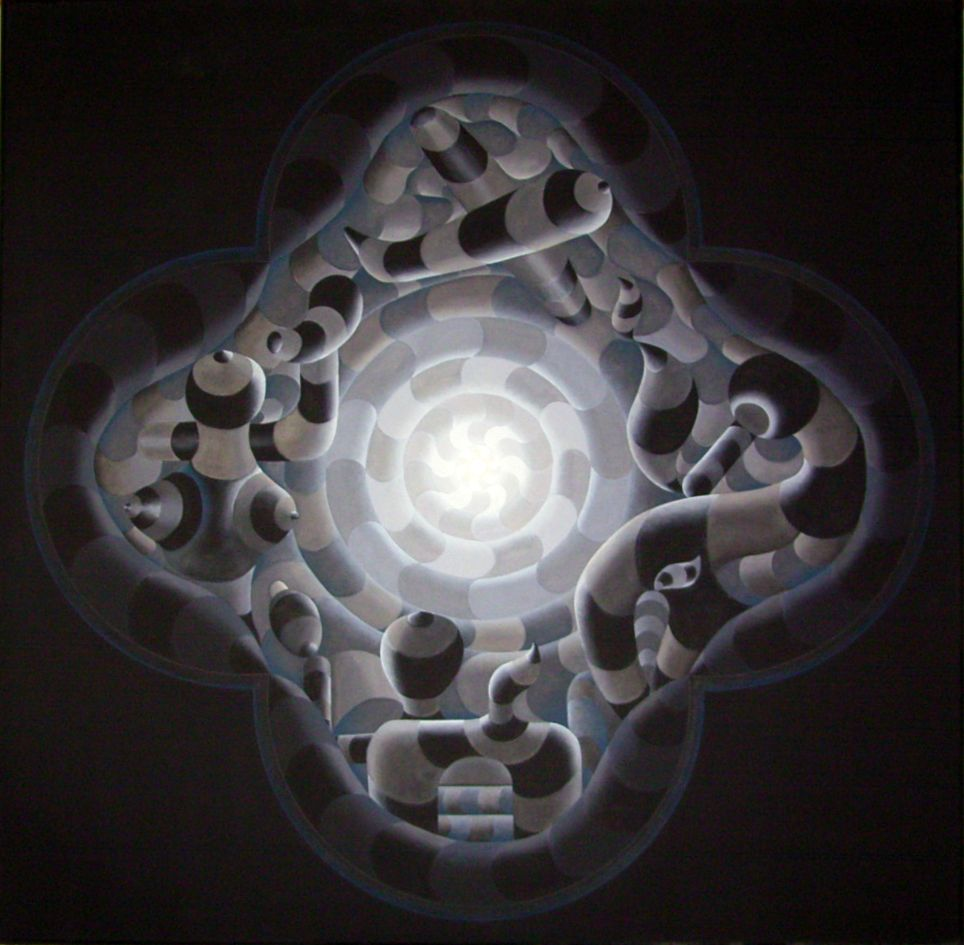
Centrovision 168

Already at the beginning of his studies, Mamtani was aware of Kandinsky, one of the groundbreakers of modernism, who had been searching for spiritual dimensions in art. For Mamtani it can go as far back as William Blake in the 18th century or extend to a German contemporary like Joseph Beuys, who was influenced by the anthroposophic teachings of Rudolf Steiner.

In Munich, in the 1960s, he was influenced by Constructivism, and with his Indian background, by Tantra art. Out of these origins arose his "Centrovision" series, which – already in 1990 – consisted of more than 3000 works.

=== Quote ===
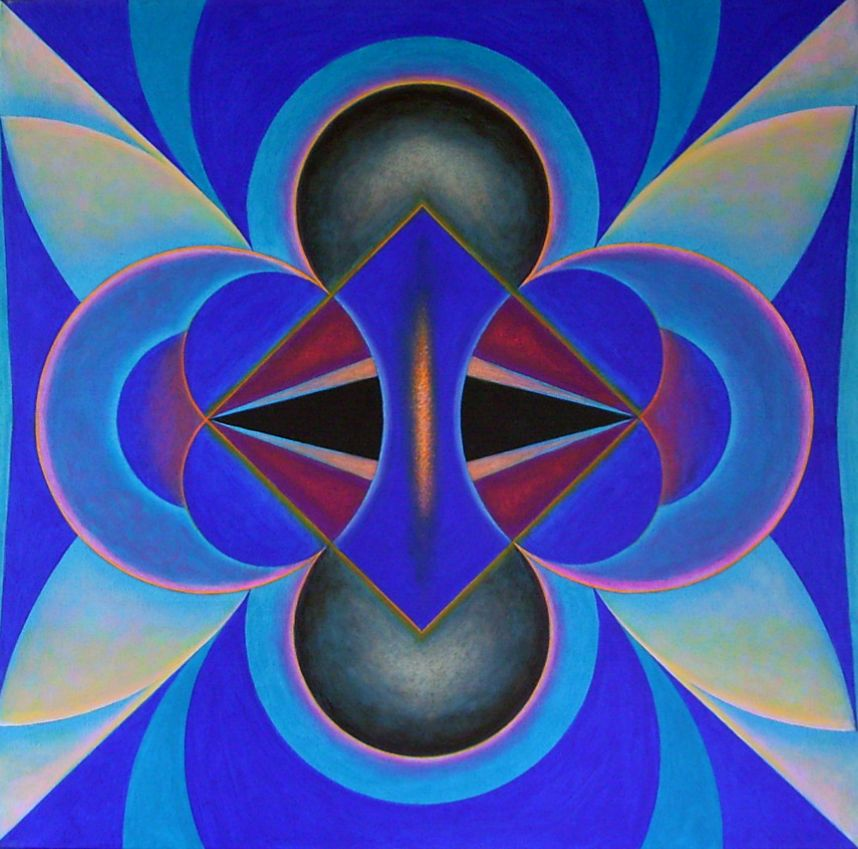
Centrovision 1204

The inspiration for Mahirwan Mamtani's conception of "Centrovision" is derived from the manifestation of tantric doctrines. Emanating from the centre toward the outside, his forms are akin to the mandala concept, the visual manifestation of which are based on the axiom of microcosm versus macrocosm. The feeling of procreation is evoked by the rhythmical arrangement of symmetrical, curvilinear organic forms, the roots of which could be traced in the form of the female, the symbol of Shakti, the supreme cosmic energy. Instead of having a flux of light, the paintings are permeated with the whispering tonal values achieved through the integration of colour hues with soft light which becomes the essential ingredient for the modulation of pulsating circular forms.

— Dr. L.P. Sihare, Neo-Tantra Exhibition Catalogue

Some of his earlier multimedia projects were graphic animation films: CENTROVISION (1981) and FACES (1982). Starting in 1990 he built upon an idea from earlier (1985) works, where he had begun to let faces appear in some of his artwork. He performed dances wearing several mandala masks, which he had painted on wood, and recorded these dances in the form of photos and videos with the help of a self-timer. He then painted over the surface of the resulting photo sheets with acrylic colours, creating a series of new mixed-media works of art which he called "Transmuted Fotos". During that time he also experimented with other mixed media.

From the year 2000 onwards, Mamtani created "Mandala Conscious Beings" where he focused on figurative paintings using mandala masks as central elements. This was driven by his urge to deal with human emotions (masks). His remarks were "We all are constantly wearing masks. We are changing the masks, but not removing them."

Around 2003, he also started working on earlier dance videos, recomposing them into new clips (some of them available on YouTube).

== Accomplishments ==
Art Samples
External Weblinks

- Centrovision 727
- Website of Dhoomimal Art Centre, Neu Delhi showing six images
- Centrovision 57
- Centrovison 65

In India Mamtani is counted among the Neo-Tantra artists Biren De, G.R. Santosh, K. C. S. Paniker, Sohan Qadri, Proffula Mohanti, Haridasan, Om Prakash Sharma, P.T. Reddy, Viswanathan. The group exhibited in several museums in Germany, USA and Australia.

In Europe, Mamtani belongs to a group of artists THE SPIRITUAL IN ART – Domenico Caneschi, Italy – Pietro Gentili, Italy – Guy Harloff, France – Joerg Anton Schulthess, Switzerland – Nora Ullmann, Israel. This group was initiated in the 1970s by Dr. Walter Schönenberger, the director of museum in Lugano, who organised several exhibitions in Locarno, Aarau, Milano and Bochum.

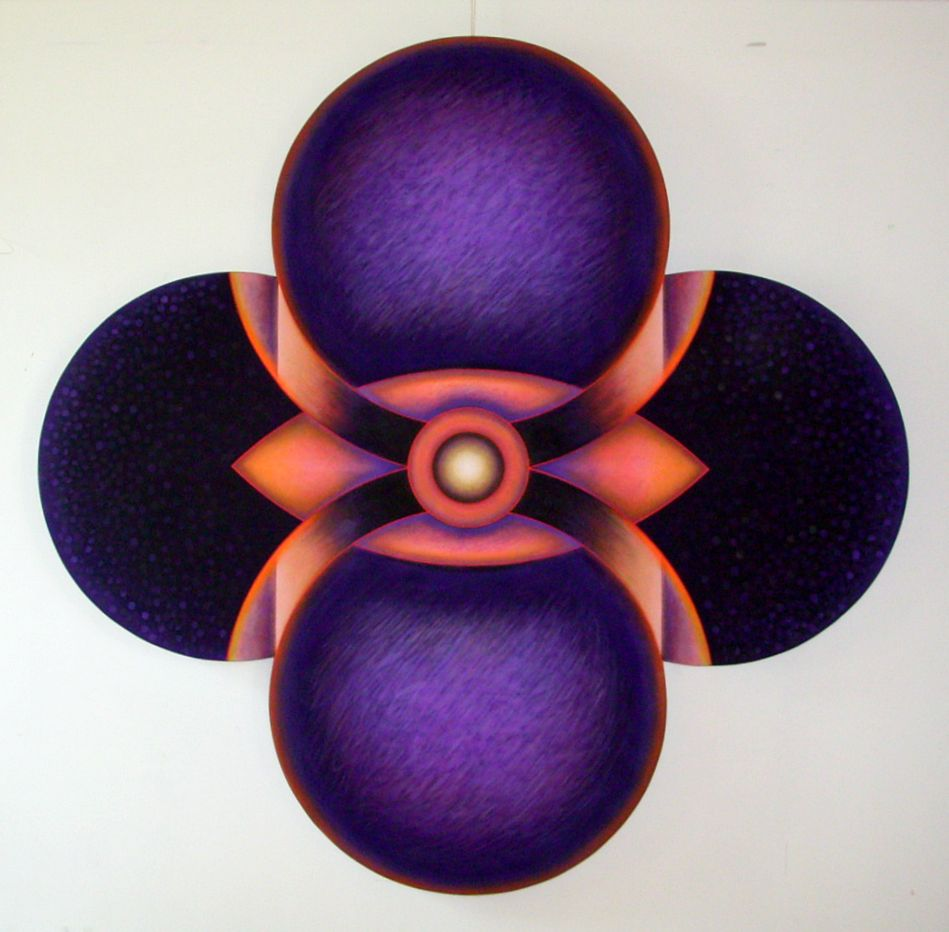
Centrovision 1164 1990 190x190 acrylic-wood-cutout

== Graphic editions ==
- Edition modern art galerie, Berlin
- Bruckmann Verlag, München
- Kunstverein München
- Galerie Toni Brechbühl, Grenchen
- Galerie Regio, Freiburg
- Galerie Becher, Wuppertal
- Edition Galerie Wassermann, München

== Awards among others ==
- 1976 Tokyo, 10th International Print Biennale
- 1978 New Delhi, National Award in Painting, Lalit Kala Akademi

== Literature ==
- Lalit Kala Akademie (1970). "Contemporary 30 + 31 Art journal".
- Catalogue 30 JAHRE GALERIE TONI BRECHBUEHL Grenchen. Grenchen, Switzerland: GALERIE TONI BRECHBUEHL. 1970.
- Dr. Walter Schönenberger, ed. (1973). Catalogue SITUAZIONE SIMBOLO MILANO. Mailand: Edizioni Galleria San Fedele.
- Catalogue WELTANSCHAUUNG ALS BILDIDEE – GEMALTE WELTSCHAU. Aargauer Kunsthaus, Aarau (Switzerland) and Museum Bochum Kunstsammlung. 1975.
- Chaitanya, Krishna (1976). A history of Indian painting. New Delhi: Abhinav Publications. ISBN 81-7017-310-8.
- Catalogue THE 10TH INTERNATIONAL BIENNIAL OF PRINTS IN TOKYO. Tokyo/Kyoto: National Museum of Modern Art, Tokyo and the National Museum of Modern Art, Kyoto. 1976–1977.
- TANTRA, Philosophie und Bildidee Aspekte zeitgenoessischer indischer Kunst. Stuttgart: Institut_für_Auslandsbeziehungen. 1983.
- Pran Nath Mago (1985). CONTEMPORARY ART IN INDIA. National Book Trust, India. pp. 94–95. ISBN 81-237-3419-0.
- Jaykar, Pupul (1985). Festival of India in the United States, 1985–1986. New York: H.N. Abrams. ISBN 0-8109-0937-5.
- Dagmar Gräfin Bernstorff (1986). Deutschland – Porträt einer Nation. Vol. 10. Bertelsmann Lexikothek Verlag. p. 286. ISBN 3-570-08720-4.
- Dr.Edith A.Tonelli, UCL (1986). NEO-TANTRA exhibition catalogue. Los Angeles: UCL, Los Angeles.
- Jutta Ströter-Bender; Helena. Spanjaard (1991), Zeitgenössische Kunst der Dritten Welt: Äthiopien, Australien (Aboriginals), Indien, Indonesien, Jamaica, Kenia, Nigeria, Senegal und Tanzania (in German), Köln: DuMont Buchverlag, pp. 172–174, ISBN 3-7701-2665-3
- Johanna Kerschner (October 1992). Interview. München: Münchner Kultur-Magazin APPLAUS.
- Edda Bhattacharjee (1993). Catalogue INDISCHE GEGENWARTSKUNST/WSPÓLCZESNA SZTUKA HINDUSKA. Frankfurt am Main und Szczecin (Polen).
- Ströter-Bender, Jutta; Spanjaard, Helena (1995). L'art contemporain dans les pays du "Tiers monde": Australie (Aborigènes), Ethiopie, Inde, Indonésie, Jamaïque, Kenya, Nigéria, Sénégal et Tanzanie. L'Harmattan. ISBN 2-7384-3184-4.
- Dr. Georg Lechner, ed. (1995). Catalogue MY EAST IS YOUR WEST cross-cultural explorations in photography. New Delhi: Max Mueller Bhavan (Goethe-Institut).
- Hans Gedat, Wien (1997). LET IT BE – Edition Art of Life. Wien.
- Catalogue SYMBOLISM & GEOMETRY IN INDIAN ART. New Delhi: National Gallery of Modern Art. 1998.
- Catalogue THE DUAL PATH OF INDIAN ART TODAY. München: Galerie Müller+Plate. 2003.
- Catalogue INDIA INSTITUTE 75TH ANNIVERSARY exhibition of paintings in collaboration with Galerie Müller+Plate. München: Sotheby's. 2004.
- Sheth, Pratima (2006). Dictionary of Indian art artists : including technical art term. [Ahmedabad]: Mapin Pub. ISBN 81-85822-90-5.

== List of exhibitions ==
=== Exhibitions (selection of over 30 worldwide) ===
- 1964 New Delhi AIFACS Gallery
- 1967 München, Galerie Stenzel
- 1967 Augsburg, Ecke Galerie
- 1967 Mainz, Galerie Winfried Gurlitt
- 1967 Zürich, Galerie La Fourmi´re
- 1970 Berlin, modern art galerie
- 1970 Grenchen, Galerie Toni Brechbühl
- 1971 Heilbronn, Galerie Rota
- 1972 München, Kunstverein
- 1972 Wuppertal, Schauspielhaus
- 1973 London, Commonwealth Art Gallery
- 1974 München, Art Galerie Schwabylon
- 1974 Wuppertal, Galerie Becher
- 1975 New Delhi, Gallery Chanakya
- 1976 Heilbronn, Galerie Lee Babel
- 1979 New Delhi, Gallery Chanakya
- 1985 München, Galerie Transart
- 1986 New Delhi, Dhoomimal Art Centre
- 1988 München, Galerie Rozmarin
- 1991 New Delhi, Dhoomimal Art Centre
- 1993 Hanau, Galerie Neunauge
- 1994 Zürich, Galerie Gerhard Zähringer
- 1995 New Delhi, LTG Art Gallery
- 1998 Landsberg, Stadttheater
- 2002 Hanau, Galerie Neunauge
- 2009 New Delhi, Dhoomimal Art Centre

=== Group exhibitions (selection) ===
- 1968 München, Kunstverein
- 1969 München, Große Kunstausstellung Haus der Kunst
- 1970 Berlin, Frühjahrsmesse
- 1970 Basel, Internationale Kunstmesse Galerie Regio
- 1970 München, Große Kunstausstellung Haus der Kunst
- 1971 Basel, Mustermesse Galerie Brechbühl/modern art
- 1971 München, Große Kunstausstellung Haus der Kunst
- 1971 München, Kunstzone
- 1971 Köln, Kunstmarkt Galerie Brechbühl/Galerie Regio
- 1972 New Delhi, National Exhibition of Art Lalit Kala
- 1972 Basel, Art '72 – Galerie Brechbühl/Galerie Regio
- 1972 München, Große Kunstausstellung Haus der Kunst
- 1972 München, Mandala in der zeitgenössischen Kunst
- 1972 Düsseldorf, Internationaler Markt für aktuelle Kunst
- 1973 New York, Young Artists '73
- 1973 Locarno, Ipotesi per Unarte Simbolica
- 1973 Milano, Situazione Simbolo
- 1973 Düsseldorf, Internationaler Markt für aktuelle Kunst
- 1973 New Delhi, National Exhibition of Art Lalit Kala
- 1974 Segovia, Bienal Internacional de Obra Grafica Y ArteSeriado
- 1975 New Delhi, Third International Triennale – India
- 1975 Aarau, Kunsthalle – Weltanschauung als Bildidee-Weltschau
- 1976 Bochum, Museum – Weltanschauung als Bildidee <- Weltschau
- 1976 Tokyo, Museum of Modern Art, International Print Biennial
- 1976 Nürnberg, Germanisches Nationalmuseum, Bild+Text
- 1977 Melbourne, Western Pacific Print Biennale
- 1977 Paris, Salon de Mai
- 1978 New Delhi, Fourth International Triennale-India
- 1978 Ljubljana, Moderna Galerija, International Art '78
- 1978 Landau, Städtische Galerie
- 1979 Tolentino, Biennale Internazionale dell Umorismo nell'Arte
- 1980 Mannheim, Rosengarten, Surya Galerie
- 1982 Darmstadt, Kunsthalle
- 1982 Bergkamen, 6. bbb – Kunst zum Überleben
- 1982 Ibiza, X Bienal Internacional
- 1983 Stuttgart, Forum für Kulturaustausch
- 1983 München, BBK Galerie der Künstler, Aufführung des Films 'Centrovision'
- 1984 München, Große Kunstausstellung Haus der Kunst
- 1984 Düsseldorf, Kunstmuseum der Stadt Düsseldorf
- 1984 Wien, Kunsthaus, Bayerische Kunst Heute
- 1984 Hannover, Kubus an der Aegidienkirche
- 1984 Oberhausen, Kunstverein Oberhausen
- 1984 Bayreuth, Iwalewa-Haus Universität Bayreuth
- 1984 Tokyo, 15th International Art Biennale
- 1985 Ljubljana, International Art Collection
- 1986 Los Angeles, Neo-Tantra Wight Art Gallery UCL
- 1986 New South Wales, Neo-Tantra-Art
- 1986 Frankfurt, Buchmesse – Zeitgenössische Malerei
- 1987 Warschau, Contemporary Indian Painting
- 1987 Moskau/Leningrad/Riga, Festival of India
- 1987 Tolentino, Biennale Internazionale dell Umorismo nell'Arte
- 1987 München, Transart Galerie, Stille Räume
- 1988 St. Gallen, Stadttheater
- 1988 Neumarkt, Steinmühle, Kunst für Lebensräume
- 1988 Perpignan/Frankreich, Biennale Internationale de l'Estampe
- 1991 Bad Kissingen, Galerie Hirnickel
- 1991 Köln, Die Weisse Galerie
- 1993 Tolentino, Biennale Internazionale dell Umorismo nell'Arte
- 1993 Mainz, Galerie Rathaus
- 1993 Stettin, Schloß der Pommerschen Fürsten
- 1995 Tolentino, Biennale Internazionale dell Umorismo nell'Arte
- 1995 New Delhi, Max Müller Bhavan
- 2003 München, Galerie Müller+Plate
- 2004 München, India Institute 75th Anniversary, at Sotheby's
- 2004 New Delhi, NRI artists, National Gallery of Modern Art, New Delhi
- 2007 New Delhi/Kolkota, EARTH ON CANVAS – WWF-India
- 2007 Lamia Greece, Belle Arte Lamia '07 – videoart
