= Schlitt =

Schlitt is a German language habitational surname. Notable people with the name include:

- Heinrich Schlitt (1849–1923), German painter and illustrator
- John Schlitt (1950), American musician
- Martin Schlitt (1966), German wheelchair curler
