= Peter Hartwig =

Peter Hartwig may refer to:

- Peter Hartwig (missionary) (1778-1815), German Anglican missionary
- Peter Hartwig (painter) (born 1963), Dutch painter
