= Karina Smigla-Bobinski =

German-Polish artist (born 1967)

- Born: 1967 (age 58–59); Szczecin, Poland
- Education: Academy of Fine Arts Cracow; Academy of Fine Arts, Munich
- Known for: Interactive installations, kinetic sculptures, post-digital art, video stages
- Movement: Intermedia artist
- Website: smigla-bobinski.com

Karina Smigla-Bobinski (1967) is a German-Polish intermedia artist, working primarily in new media art and digital art, based in Berlin and Munich.Her work bridges kinetic art, drawing, video, installation, painting, performance and sculpture. Her works have been exhibited in Europe, Asia, North America and South America. One of her major works is ADA, a large, interactive kinetic sculpture and drawing machine.

== Life and education ==
Smigla-Bobinski studied art and visual communication at the Academy of Fine Arts in Kraków, Poland and the Academy of Fine Arts, Munich, Germany and graduated as a master student of Gerhard Berger in 2000.

== Career ==
Smigla-Bobinski's work has been shown in galleries and museums including Grande halle de la Villette Museum Paris; and the Nottingham Castle Museum and Art Gallery where her work was exhibited in correlation with Leonardo da Vinci: 10 Drawings from the Royal Collection.

One of her major works is ADA – analog interactive installation, a large kinetic sculpture and drawing machine. Her interactive installation Simulacra engages viewers to discover hidden images displayed on video screens by using magnifying glasses.

Her work has been written about in The Atlantic, Wired, TANZ Magazine, Imperica, Le Journal de Québec, Business Insider, The Vancouver Sun, e-flux, and Calgary Herald.

In 2016 she was a visiting research fellow and artist in residence at ZiF Center for Interdisciplinary Research, Bielefeld, the Bielefeld University’s Institute for Advanced Study, a cultural institution that supports collaborations and dialogue between the arts and sciences.

== Literature ==
- "OVERS!ZE - The Mega Art & Installations“. Victionary (May 2013), 216 pages, ISBN 978-988-19439-8-9.
- "highlike book“, FILE and SESI (October 2014), 584 pages ISBN 978-85-8205-297-6.
- "T.R.I.B.E. – Exercises in Transitory Art (MoTA Editions # 2)", MoTA (March 2014)
- "Tanz Magazine“ - Der Theaterverlag – Friedrich Berlin GmbH (Januar 2016) "ADA"..
- "Baumgartens Erfindung der Ästehtik“, Ursula Franke, Reihe „KunstPhilosophie“, Mentis Verlag (2018) ISBN 978-3-95743-103-5.
- "New Media Installation: Technology in Art", Gingko Press (2018) ISBN 158423718X ISBN 9781584237181.
- "The New York Times“ (Januar 2019) Schwendener, Martha (2 January 2019). "Pittsburgh Report: Five Places for Healing Through Art". The New York Times..

== Exhibitions ==
Her works have been shown at museums galleries and festivals, including:

- Bangkok University Gallery in Bangkok, Thailand
- Künstlerinnen und Künstler (BBK Gallery) in Munich, Germany
- Busan Biennale in Busan, Korea
- Centre for Fine Arts (Bozar) in Brussels, Belgium
- CURRENTS New Media Festival, 2015
- Electronic Language International Festival (FILE) in São Paulo and Rio de Janeiro, Brazil
- Foundation for Art and Creative Technology (FACT) in Liverpool, England
- Garage Museum of Contemporary Art in Moscow, Russia
- Grande halle de la Villette in Paris, France
- The Lowry in Manchester, England
- Maison des Arts de Créteil in Paris, France
- Mattress Factory in Pittsburgh, USA
- Microwave International New Media Arts Festival in Hong Kong, China
- The Mois Multi festival, Quebec
- Museum of Transitory Art (MoTA) in Ljubljana, Slovenia
- New Media Gallery in New Westminster, BC, Canada
- Nottingham Castle Museum & Art Gallery in Nottingham, England
- Olympiapark in Munich, Germany
- Patricia and Phillip Frost Museum of Science in Miami, USA
- Science Gallery in Dublin, Ireland
- Singapore Art Museum in Singapore
- Staatstheater am Gärtnerplatz in Munich, Germany
- Suwon IPARK in Korea
- WRO Media Art Biennale in Wroclaw, Poland
- ZERO1 Biennial in Silicon Valley, USA
