= Kogler =

Kogler or Kögler is a German surname. Notable people with the surname include:

- Alfred Kogler, Austrian luger
- Armin Kogler (born 1959), Austrian ski jumper
- Ignaz Kögler (1680–1746), German Jesuit missionary in China
- Kaspar Kögler (1838–1923), German painter, illustrator and writer
- Stefan Kögler, Austrian luger
- Walter Kogler (born 1967), Austrian footballer and manager
