= Barbara Zeigler =

Canadian visual artist

- Born: 1949 (age 76–77); London, Ontario, Canada
- Known for: Artist, Educator, Writer
- Website: http://www.bzeigler.com/

Barbara Zeigler (1949) is a Canadian visual artist with a focus in print media. She has also worked in drawing, video, installation and collaborative public art, often combining these media with her work in print to prompt questions as to the character and consequences of our existing cultural paradigms. Her artwork focuses on the evolving relationship between human culture and the ecosphere, with special consideration given to the ways in which individual and collective identity become evident through land usage. Zeigler lives and works in Vancouver, British Columbia, Canada.

== Biography ==
Zeigler was born in London, Ontario in 1949. She received her BFA in Painting and her MFA in Printmaking at the University of Illinois Urbana-Champaign. She also studied abroad at the Academy of Fine Arts, Munich and LMU Munich. She has taught at the University of Alberta, Nova Scotia College of Art and Design, and Queen's University. She is currently a professor at the University of British Columbia, Department of Art History, Visual Art and Theory, where she is also the supervisor of the UBC Print Media Research Centre.

== Artwork ==
=== Hidden Sites ===
Zeigler exhibition and work Hidden Sites focuses on overlooked places and journeys which have significant and debilitating effects, namely the five-hour journey of garbage removal from the large city of Vancouver to the Cache Creek landfill, and Broughton Archipelago of central British Columbia, where migrating salmon is significantly hurt by sea lice from a multitude of nearby fish farms the salmon must cross in their journey. Exhibited at the Richmond Art Gallery in 2009, the show consisted of a series of still and time based works that reflected on the long journeys of the trucks and salmon, examining how the landscape and ecosystem are being re-shaped. The Fraser River is considered to be the greatest salmon river in the world, Robin Laurence describes the urgency of Zeigler's work in that it "asks, given the evidence of toxins leaching into wells and waterways from the mammoth landfill? Given the evidence, too, of fish farms, logging, pulp mills, and global warming, all wreaking destruction on the native salmon population. For how long?"

=== Earthmakers ===
From 1995 to 1998, Ziegler collaborated with artist Joan Smith on the traveling exhibition Earthmakers. The installation work conjured up the natural cycles of life and death in time, and the delicate nature of the ecosystem, by presenting what inhabits one square meter of old-growth forest soil. Further activated with multimedia elements, photo-etchings on kozo paper, a soundtrack, collage and monoprints related to the landscape, the installation also invited contributions by the public and from materials found in the area. School programming and classes also contributed collage and monoprint works. It is noted in Paula Gustafson's review of the work, that Zeigler and Smith's career has shown a devotion to inquiring and critiquing aspects of environmental desecration and humanities complacency, the research process of the work started "not of deconstructing as might be expected, but of reconstruction-via drawing, photography, photocopying, computer imaging, and etching--of the unseen and virtually unknown beneath their feet." Collaboration between Zeigler and Smith was an integral component to understanding the intention towards the content, as the notes accompanying the exhibition show that "the artists spent hundreds of preparatory hours on the project in pursuits that sought to balance 'shared works' with 'autonomous creation.' The attitude of artists to information --the scientific component (for which soil scientist Jeff Battigelli provided soil samples and expertise) attests to the fact that ideas need not be treated as property, but ought to be nurtured like flourishing organisms as they are advanced through art production." The exhibition was first mounted at Edmonton Art Gallery, then Nanaimo Art Gallery, and at the Richmond Art Gallery. A selection of images of the work were reproduced in the September 1997 book "The Best of Printmaking" by Lynne Allen and Phyllis McGibbon, as well as a more thorough spread in The Capilano Review.
