= Rita Grosse-Ruyken =

German artist

Rita Maria Walburga Grosse-Ruyken (born 29 November 1948) is a contemporary German artist, sculptor, multimedia installation art, artfilm and performance, producer artist and member of the Association of German Artists Deutscher Kuenstlerbund. The core of her light – sound – space – form installations comprise sculptures in motion made from pure gold and silver. She became internationally known through her exhibition Rays of Light.

== Career ==
Rita Maria Walburga Grosse-Ruyken was born in Donauwörth, and grew up in a hamlet in the Swabian-Danube region. From an early age she became aware of natural phenomena and followed phonetic sound bridges. After her Abitur, from 1970 to 1972, she studied Romance and English Language and Literature at LMU Munich.

From 1971 to 1977, she studied free art (diploma) and art education (state examination and master's degree) at the Academy of Fine Arts, Munich and dedicated herself to the art of the goldsmith under the guidance of Professor Franz Rickert und Hermann Juenger. She was also influenced by Professor Guenther Fruhtrunk, a constructivist painter as well as by the religious philosopher Aloys Goergen, the president of the academy. From 1977 to 1978 she studied art history and archeology at the University of the Sorbonne in Paris.

From 1983 on, she has worked freelance dedicating herself to researching the transparency, colour, light and movement of sculptures. Since 1993, in her continual exchange with astrophysicists, musicians, philosophers, writers, sound technicians and architects, she has been expanding her activities into the performance art and into exploring of Primary Sounds produced by integrated sculptures made from pure gold and pure silver which create motion in and by themselves. Since 2008 she has been involved in the production of art films.

Samples of her work are included in the permanent collections of the International Design Museum, the Pinakothek der Moderne in Munich as well as the Kunstgewerbemuseum Berlin and MAK, Museum Angewandte Kunst (Frankfurt am Main).

Since 2008, she is creating art films. She is a member of Deutscher Künstlerbund e.V. Berlin, Bundesverband Bildender Künstlerinnen und Künstler (BBK), GEMA and VG Bild-Kunst.

== Exhibitions ==
=== Solo exhibitions (selection) ===
- 1981: The Prelude to the Round Dance – the Body as Vessel, With a Crown. Light-Form-Installation. Gallery Kröner, Castle Oberrimsingen
- 1985–2005: Installation SONNENDUNST – Zyklus I, Landakademie Rattenbach
- 1993: L'ESPRIT DE DIEU PLANAIT À LA SURFACE DES EAUX, The German contribution to the European City of Culture Antwerp
- 1994: L'ESPRIT DE DIEU PLANAIT SUR LES EAUX, Light-Form-Space-Installation. Die Neue Sammlung, International Design Museum, Munich
- 2003: IM GERICHTSSTAND. Licht-Klang-Form-Raum-Installationen. MAK, Museum Angewandte Kunst (Frankfurt am Main)
- 2004: DURCHFLUTUNG/RAYS OF LIGHT, Museum of Arts and Design (MAD), New York City & Goethe Institute, New York City
- 2009: RAYS OF LIGHT – Rita Grosse-Ruyken, MAK, Museum Angewandte Kunst (Frankfurt am Main)
- 2015: DURCHFLUTUNG AND THE WHITE STONE, ArtCOP21 Agenda culturel Paris Climat 2015
- 2019: The Power of The Heights Command: DURCHFLUTUNG und DER WEISSE STEIN. Blu-ray Disc Projektion, Haselbacher Muehle, Triftern

=== Group exhibitions (selection) ===
- 1979: Goldschmiede dieser Zeit. Körper – Schmuck – Zeichen – Raum, Kestnergesellschaft
- 1979: Körper – Zeichen, Städtische Galerie im Lenbachhaus, Munich
- 1981: Körper, Schmuck, Zeichen, Raum. Goldschmiedearbeiten, Museum of Design, Zürich
- 1984: Kirche heute. Architektur und Gerät. Süddeutscher Raum, Die Neue Sammlung, Munich
- 1993: Münchner Goldschmiede. Schmuck und Gerät der Gegenwart, Münchner Stadtmuseum, Munich
- 2004: Welt in Tropfen, (Urania, Berlin)
- 2007: Gulf Art Fair, Dubai (Galerie Thomas, Munich)
- 2009: Herbert Hoffmann Award 1973–2008, Munich
- 2011: Ausstellung Pinakothek München
- 2011: Modern Contemporary Art, Salwa Zeidan Gallery, Abu Dhabi Art
- 2012: Im Zeichen der Ewigkeit. Positionen zeitgenössischer Kunst, Neues Museum Kloster Schussenried
- 2012: Quinta Essentia, Deutscher Künstlerbund Berlin
- 2013: intimate, Frameless Gallery London
- 2018: KünstlerINNen. Zeitgenössische Positionen in Verbindung mit historischen Werken, Kunsthaus Burg Obernberg, Austria
- 2019: ITSLIQUID Group: ALCHEMIC BODY. THE LINE Contemporary Art Space, London
- 2020: VISION EUROPA. 30 Jahre Kultur und Geschichtsverein Vilshofen. Stadtturm, Vilshofen
- 2020: DURCHFLUTUNG III / RAYS OF LIGHT III. Danner-Preis 2020/100 Jahre Danner-Stiftung, The Design Museum, Pinakothek der Moderne, Munich
- 2023: 30 x 30 x 30 Jahresausstellung 2023 - Künstler des BBK Niederbayern. Kulturmodell, Passau
- 2023: Geöffnet – verschlossen: Tür und Tor in der bildenden Kunst. Galerie der Stiftung BC – pro arte, Biberach
- 2023: Danner-Preis 2023 der Danner-Stiftung. Heiliggeistkirche, Landshut

== Literature ==
- Sabine Runde (Hrsg.): Transformationen – rays of light (Mit Beiträgen u.a. von Hans Wichmann, Aloys Goergen, André Fischer, Friedrich Piel. Texte in Deutsch und Englisch), Museum für Angewandte Kunst, Frankfurt 2009, ISBN 978-3-88270-110-4
- Rita Grosse-Ruyken (Hrsg.): Der Stein der Weisen / quinta essentia. Landakademie für Kunst und Naturphilosophie, Triftern 2012. (Mit Beiträgen von Aloys Goergen, Harald Szeemann und Hans Wichmann)
- Rita Grosse-Ruyken: Rita Grosse-Ruyken. In: Caroline Sternberg, Kathrina Rudolph (Hrsg.): Künstler*Innen an der ADBK München. Akademie der Bildenden Künste München, 2023. S. 23-27

== Awards ==
- 1974: Herbert Hofmann Award
- 1976: Benvenuto Cellini Award
- 1990: State sponsorship award for young artists and writers in the field of "jewelry of gold and silversmiths"

== Art films ==
- 2013: Performance THE DRAWING FROM THE GOLDEN CHALICE in Abu Dhabi
- 2014: The Birth of The Golden DURCHFLUTUNG II during 1987-1990
- 2014: LE SOUFFLE DE DIEU PLANAIT À LA SURFACE DES EAUX about the 1993 performance in Antwerpen
- 2015: RAYS OF LIGHT, about the 2009 exhibition with the same name
- 2006-2019: DURCHFLUTUNG und DER WEISSE STEIN: a film with 12 chapters (length: 17,5 hours)
- 2018: DER EWIGE QUELL, about the coming "Museum of Visionary Art" in Triftern
- 2021: Performance DURCHFLUTUNG - DER ERDE at Pinakothek der Moderne, München
