= Louis Christian Hess =

Austrian painter and sculptor

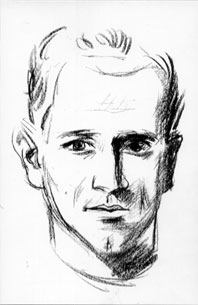
Self portrait (1921)

Louis Christian Hess, artistic name of Alois Anton Hess, known also as Christian Hess (Bozen, 24 December 1895 – Schwaz, 26 November 1944) was an Austrian painter and sculptor of the German Neue Sachlichkeit (New Objectivity) during the 1920s.

== Early years ==
In 1915 Hess exhibited his first works - drawings, tempera and engravings - at the "Turn und Taxishof Galerie" in Innsbruck. During World War I Hess fought on the French front at the Somme and Ardennes. After the war, from 1919 to 1924 he attended the Bayerische Akademie der Bildenden Künste in Munich, in the class of Prof. C. Becker-Gundhal. In 1920 Hess attended the first collective exhibition "Ausstellung Junger Münchner - Graphische Kunstwerkstätten" in Munich presented by George Jacob Wolf. In the following 1921 exhibition "Ausstellung Junger Münchner" at the Gemälde Galerie Sct. Martinus, also in Munich, he exhibited works alongside pieces by Florian Bosch, Adolf Hartmann, Siegfried Kühnel, Georg Liebhardt, Josef Nickl, Eugen Siegler, Bernhard Therhorst and the sculptors Lothar Dietz and Benno Miller. After his sister Emma moved to Sicily in 1924, Hess made frequent trips to Italy, drawing inspiration from the colour and mediterranean light that he poured into his art.

== Christian Hess and the Juryfreie ==
In 1928 he became close to Max Beckmann until his exile. Hess participated in the "Sommer Ausstellung des Deutschen Künstler Verbandes AUFBAU - E. V." in Munich and some of his paintings were shown in Berlin. In 1929 he joined the "Juryfreie" movement, becoming its leader until his ban in 1933 by the National Socialist regime. In "Aus meinem Künstnotizbuch", the art critic Wilhelm Hausenstein wrote: "Juryfreie reveals itself as a prominent artistic group... I notice Christian Hess, Josef Scharl, Fritz Burkhardt, Grassmann, Panizza and sculptors such as Spengler and Zeh". Art magazines published Hess's works: the Lipsian "Cicerone" published the painting "Am Strand" (On the beach); the Munich magazine "Jugend", official voice of the "Jugendstil" movement, published on the cover of the April 1930 issue the oil painting "Fischer mit roter Weste" (Fisherman with red jacket), central part of a triptych shown at the Secession exhibition.

In the same year, the catalogue "Zweijahrbuch" (1929–30) presented by the critic Hans Eckstein, with essays by Franz Rho, Oskar Maria Graf and Wolfgang Petzet, published the paintings "Neptun" and "Matrosen" produced in Messina. Hess frescoed the thermal bath in Oeynhausen (Westphalia). "Jugend" reproduced "Am Wasser", the central part of a triptych shown at the June Secession exhibition.

On 6 June 1931, in the Munich Glaspalast fire, works by Hess and other artists were burnt. For the "Juryfreie" artists an extraordinary exhibition was organised in the German Museum. In the same year Hess was in Rome with his friend Karl Hofer. Back in Germany there began a movement of painters, sculptors and architects and in the exhibition "Bildhauer Maler Architekt" Hess presented cartoons for the frescoes of a cinema with sound in Breslau. 1932 was still a year of great artistic vitality. With the "Juryfreien" Hess exhibited the painting "Wartesaal III Klasse in Bologna" (Monspreis London - Opus 30) and sculptures in the Munich "Lenbach Galerie" and in Düsseldorf. A season of exhibitions followed with the Deutscher Künstlerbund in Berlin, Nuremberg, Koenigsberg, Danzig and Rostock.

== The years of exile ==
The artistic ostracism practised by Nazism moved Hess to a voluntary exile. In 1933, after the dissolution of Jurifreie, regarded by the regime as a "Bolshevik cultural union", he moved to Sicily. The following year he married the Swiss citizen Cecile Faesy with whom he left for Switzerland. There he had to work in difficult conditions because since 1935 Germans were not welcome. He ran some theatre direction, scenography and made some puppet engravings. Through some friends he was able to sell some unsigned paintings but in 1936 went back to Sicily with the wife that he divorced some months later. From friends still in Germany and Austria he knew that the political situation was worsening. He studied new techniques but depression brought him to the edge of suicide. Supported by his sister Emma he found the energy to go back north. In 1938 he was in Switzerland again, in Liestal, in the house of his close friend Jurg Spiller but he did not receive a residence permit. Then he moved to Germany where the cultural and artistic life was under the strict control of the regime. In 1939 he was hosted in Chiemsee by his friend Franz Saverius Gebhardt-Westerbuchberg. There he was able to paint and model sculptures. In Oberwössen, Bavaria, he frescoed the walls of a restaurant owned by the widow of his friend, the sculptor Oskar Zeh, who had committed suicide in 1935 in Munich. His health worsened. Seriously ill, he spent 1941 in Schwabing Hospital, then in Planegg Asylum. Once he was discharged, he went to the Tyrol, first to Axams and Innsbruck, then to Grinzens and to Zirl, where he painted frescos in the municipal offices. In 1942 he was back in Innsbruck. The Tyrolean Artistic Union ("Der Landsleiter der Reichskammer der Bildenden Künste beim Landskulturwalter Gau Tirol Voralberg") provided him with an atelier. After his last hospitalization he died on 26 November 1944, during an air raid on Innsbruck, where he is buried, in the Westfriedhof.

== Bibliography ==
- Zweijharebuch (1929–30) - Deutscher Künstlerverband die Juryfreien - München E.V. - 1930
- Christian Hess - Exhibition catalog - Palermo - 1974
- Christoph Stolzl, Die Zwanziger Jahre in München, München, Münchner Stadtmuseums, 1979
- Abbild und Emotion - österreicher Realismus -1914 1944 - Manfred Wagner et al. - Edition Tusch Wien - 1984 ISBN 978-3-85063-151-8
- Im Spiegel der Wirklichkeit - Matthias Boeckl - Museumsverein Bruneck - 2007
- Christian Hess 1895 1944 - Museum Rabalderhaus Schwatz - Stadtmuseum Bozen - Athesia BZ - 2008 - ISBN 978-88-8266-414-5
- Christian Hess. Ein Tiroler in Sizilien. Edition Schütz, Wien 2012, ISBN 978-3-9501052-7-8
