= Pakhal Tirumal Reddy =

Indian artist (1915–1996)

P T Reddy
- Born: Pakala Tirumal Reddy; 4 January 1915; Annaram, Telangana, India
- Died: 1996 (aged 80–81)
- Spouse: Yashoda Reddy
- Writing career
- Language: Telugu

Pakala Tirumal Reddy (1915–1996) was an Indian artist. He was the fifth child born to Ram Reddy and Ramanamma at Annaram village, Karimnagar district, Telangana, India. He received his diploma in painting from J. J. School of Art, Bombay in 1939. He married Yashoda Reddy on 9 May 1947, and she completed a master's of art and Ph.D. degrees and authored over 22 compilations and novels.

== Work ==
P T Reddy played a role in the introduction and the evolution of the so-called "Modern Art" of Europe to India. He formed a group of ‘Bombay Contemporary India Artists,’ branded ‘Young Turks’, in 1941. This group of five painters was formed six years before the ‘Progressive Artists' Group’ formed in Bombay in 1947. Reddy started with realistic style and at the end of the 1930s. His original style was influenced both by traditional India paintings and Post-Impressionism. A process of integration occurred with various ‘isms’ in his work. He created works in water colour, oils, etchings and sculptures. Reddy's Srichakra engraving on aventurine stone has a Devanagari ‘sri’ in the centre, emphasizing both his title and the form of the yantra. Two figures overlay the Sri Yantra, their heads opposite one another at top and bottom, their bodies joined in sexual union in the centre. Reddy arranged their arms in a circular fashion reinforcing the lotus form, but their legs are not symmetrical: the legs of the bottom figure form a ‘V’ with the feet flanking the head of the top figure while the legs of the upper figure bend at the knees and splay outward, echoing the two directions of the triangle of the Sri Yantra. About 1970, Reddy began painting Tantric themes from Indian mythology. In his work, there are see connections and parallels to a wide range of other neo-Tantric artists, including G. R. Santosh, S.H. Raza, Mahirwan Mamtani, and Biren De, and thus he serves as an entry point and guide to the works of Indian artists.

== Style ==
Reddy's paintings from the 1940s showed a struggle to maintain his identity as Indian by choosing subject matters that were undeniably Indian, yet depicted in a variety of modern European styles. After independence in 1947, many Indian artists including Reddy re-examined India's own art traditions. Reddy's work began growing more abstract and started to reflect Buddhist, Hindu and Tantric symbols and structures. However, many of his works are secular, modern abstractions that echo their original religious sources. Reddy engaged in dialogue with contemporary life and politics, in his Moon landing series, Nehru series, and other works touching on poverty, labor movements, and the social changes wrought by India's Independence. Because of his use of the neo-Tantric idiom, his explorations of historical concerns such as these became dehistoricized and abstracted. For artists struggling with being both modern and Indian in the 1960s and 1970s, neo-Tantric imagery provided a solution, indicating a path through the abstraction/representation bind and retaining both a universality of form and a specificity of national identity.

== Awards and honors ==
Reddy won the Dolly Cursetji award for murals; Fellowship Government of India; 'Asthana Chitrakar' of the Andhra Pradesh Government, and member of the General Board of Indian Council for Cultural Relations. His works have been exhibited in the U.K., United States, Soviet Union, Sweden, Switzerland and Greece, and represented in the collections of the Royal Palace, London, N.G.M.A., New Delhi, and many other institutions. Reddy's books were Portfolio of Drawings, Paintings and Sculptures in 1941, Contemporary Painters in 1941, 40 Drawings in 1941, and Kiss Volume I in 1968. St. Mary's College of Maryland has a collection of his works in the Boyden Art Gallery.

Reddy's major work was done during the freedom struggle, and then during the muscle-flexing that occurred while the Indian diaspora was building its own identity. He produced around 3000 paintings in his lifetime. He died in 1996 and was survived by his daughter, Professor Lakshmi Reddy, who is also an artist. She runs the Sudharma Art Gallery in Hyderabad, along with her husband and her two children.

== Exhibitions ==
1941 First group exhibition, Contemporary Painters of Bombay, Bombay

1940 First solo exhibition, Bombay Art Society Salon, Bombay

1943 Solo exhibition, Bombay Art Society Salon, Bombay

1955 Annual exhibition, Hyderabad

1956 Solo exhibition, Bombay

1957 Solo exhibition, All India Industrial Exhibition Grounds, Hyderabad

1968 1st International Triennale, Lalit Kala Akademi, New Delhi

1976 Retrospective, Kala Bhavan, Santiniketan and Sudharma Modern Art Gallery, Hyderabad

1983 Solo exhibition on Tantra, West Germany

1985-86 Neo Tantra: Contemporary Indian Painting, Fredrick S. Wight Art Gallery, University of California, Los Angeles

2004 Manifestations II, organised by Delhi Art Gallery, Jehangir Art Gallery, Mumbai and Delhi Art Gallery, New Delhi

== International exhibitions ==
Triennale India

Air India Exhibitions in Australia

British Art Festival

U K British Prints Biennale U K

Art Exhibition in Japan

== Collections ==
Buckingham Palace, London

J.J. School of Art, Mumbai

Rashtrapati Bhavan, New Delhi

College of Art, New Delhi

Salarjung Museum, Hyderabad

Lalit Kala Akademi, Hyderabad

Lalit Kala Akademi, New Delhi

National Gallery of Modern Art, New Delhi

Ministry of Cultural Affairs, Government of India, New Delhi

Parliament House, New Delhi

Tata Fundamental Research Institute, Mumbai

Boyden Gallery, St. Mary's College of Maryland

== Sources ==
- http://ngmaindia.gov.in/sh-pag.asp
- Appasamy, Jaya, ‘The Painters of the Transition’, 25 Years of Indian Art
- A history of Indian painting: the modern period By Krishna Chaitanya PP.261,279
- Painting Sculpture & Graphics in the Post-Independence Era, New Delhi: Lalit Kala Akademi, (1972), pp. 6–9.
- Chakrabarty, Dipesh, Provincializing Europe, Princeton: Princeton University Press, (2000).
- Kapur, Geeta, ‘When Was Modernism in Indian Art?’: When Was Modernism? New Delhi: Tulika, (2000), pp. 297–323.
- Mookerjee, Ajit, Tantra Art: Its Philosophy and Physics, New Delhi:Ravi Kumar, (1966).https://www.amazon.com/Tantra-Art-Its-Philosophy-Physics/dp/8171672582
- https://openlibrary.org/books/OL2828821M/40_years_of_P.T._Reddy's_art.
- http://www.minusspace.com/tag/pt-reddy/
- christies.com
