= Hartwig (surname) =

Hartwig is a Germanic-language surname, literally meaning hard in battle (wikt:hart + wikt:wig).

Finnish variants of the name, derived from the North German form Harteke, include Hartik (archaic), Hartikka, Harto, Hartto, Harttu, Hartus, Harttula, Hartikkala, Hartoinen, Hartuinen and most often, Hartikainen, a Savonian noble variant.

Notable people with the surname include:

- Carter Hartwig (born 1956), American professional football player
- Clayton Hartwig (1964–1989), American sailor accused of causing the 1989 explosion of the 16" gun turret on the USS Iowa
- Edward Hartwig (1909–2003), Polish photographer
- Ernst Hartwig (1851–1923), German astronomer
- Eva Brigitta Hartwig, later Vera Zorina, German prima ballerina active in America
- Gay Hartwig (contemporary), American voice actress
- Grant Hartwig (born 1997), American professional baseball player
- Gus Hartwig (born 2002), American football player
- Ina Hartwig (born 1963), German author, journalist, culture politician
- Heike Hartwig (born 1962), German Olympic shot putter
- Jeff Hartwig (born 1967), American Olympic polevaulter
- Jens Hartwig (born 1980), German actor
- Jimmy Hartwig (born 1954), German professional football player
- John F. Hartwig (born 1964), Henry Rapoport Professor of Chemistry at the University of California, Berkeley
- Josef Hartwig (1880–1956), German sculptor, Bauhaus teacher, and designer of an iconic chess set
- Julia Hartwig (1921–2017), Polish poet and translator
- Justin Hartwig (born 1978), American professional football player
- Marie Hartwig (1906–2001), American professor of physical education and advocate of women's sports
- Nicholas Hartwig (1857–1914), Russian diplomat; ambassador to Persia 1906–08 and to Serbia 1904–14
- Rex Hartwig (1929–2022), Australian professional tennis player
- Ingmar Hartwig (born 1988), German designer
- Peter Hartwig (born 1963), Dutch painter
- Peter Hartwig (missionary), 19th century German missionary to Africa
- Roland Hartwig (born 1954), German politician
- Wolf C. Hartwig (1921–2017), German film producer

== See also ==
- Hartwich
