= Otto Quante =

German painter

Otto Quante (2 April 1875 in Minden/Westphalen – 20 February 1947 in Naumburg/Saale) was a German painter.

Quante initially studied ophthalmology. However, he gave up his practice in 1907 and dedicated himself to painting, where he became especially famous for his portrayals of the day-to-day lives of vagabonds.

He studied art at the Malschule in Worpswede, the Badischen Landeskunstschule in Karlsruhe, and the Munich Art Academy.

== Famous works ==
- Frühlingstanz, (Springtime Dance)
- Fern vom Alltag, (Far from Everyday Life)
- Die Sorglosen, (The Carefree Ones)
- Im Frühling, (In the Spring)
- Die Lerche, (The Lark) L'Alouette
