= Hartikainen =

Hartikainen is a Finnish surname related to the name Hartwig. Notable people with the surname include:

- Erkki Hartikainen (1942–2021), chairman of Atheist association of Finland
- Jani Hartikainen (born 1975), Finnish footballer
- Teemu Hartikainen (born 1990), Finnish ice hockey player
