= Academy of Fine Arts, Munich =

Art school in Munich, Germany

Coordinates: 48°09′11″N 11°34′49″E

Academy of Fine Arts
- Akademie der Bildenden Künste München
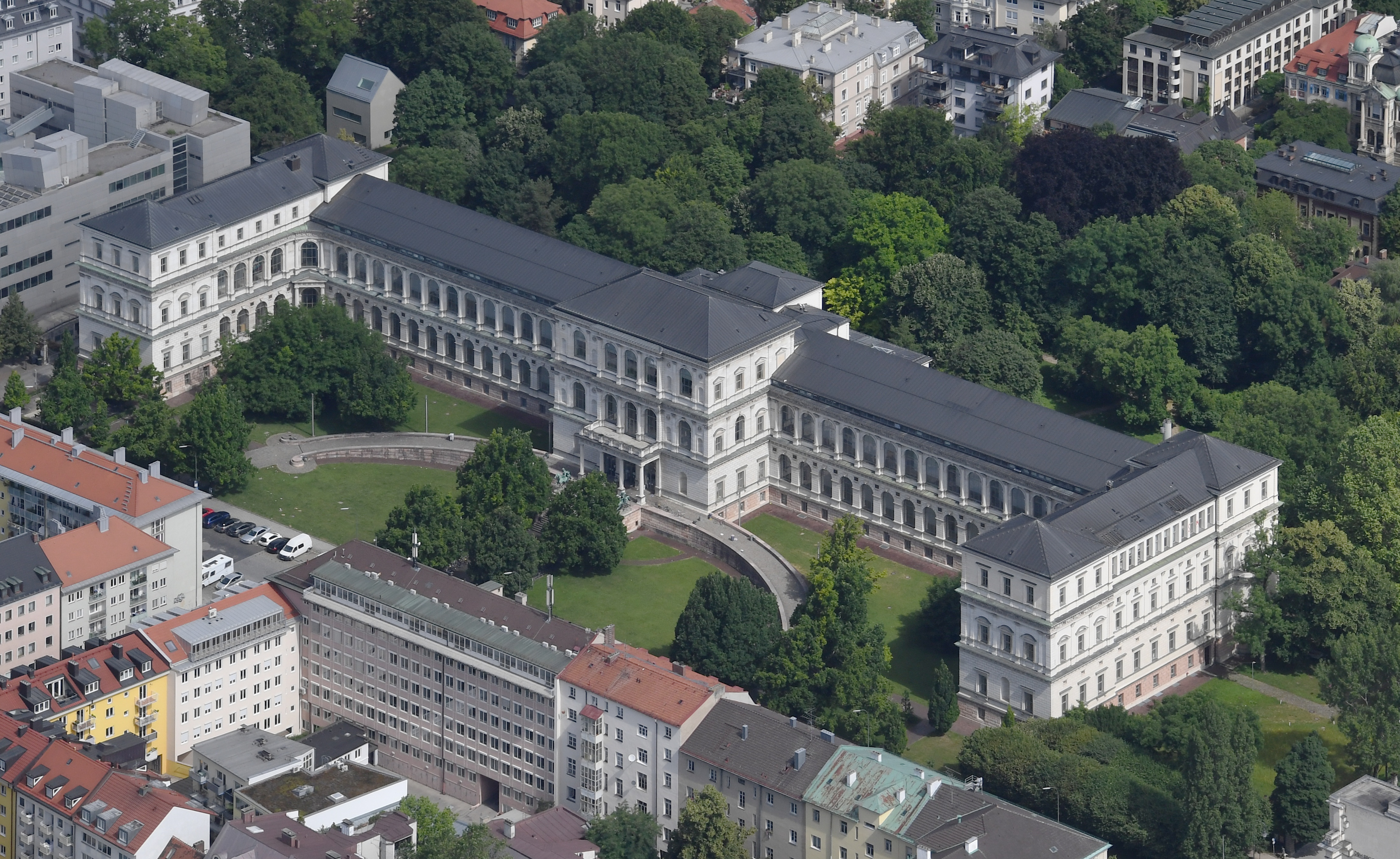
- Aerial view of the Academy of Fine Arts Munich
- Other name: Munich Academy
- Former name: Royal Academy of Fine Arts
- Type: Art academy
- Established: 13 May 1808
- Founder: Maximilian I Joseph
- President: Karen Pontoppidan
- Academic staff: 36 (2024)
- Total staff: 232 (2024)
- Students: 669 (2023)
- Location: Maxvorstadt, Munich, Bavaria, Germany
- Website: adbk.de
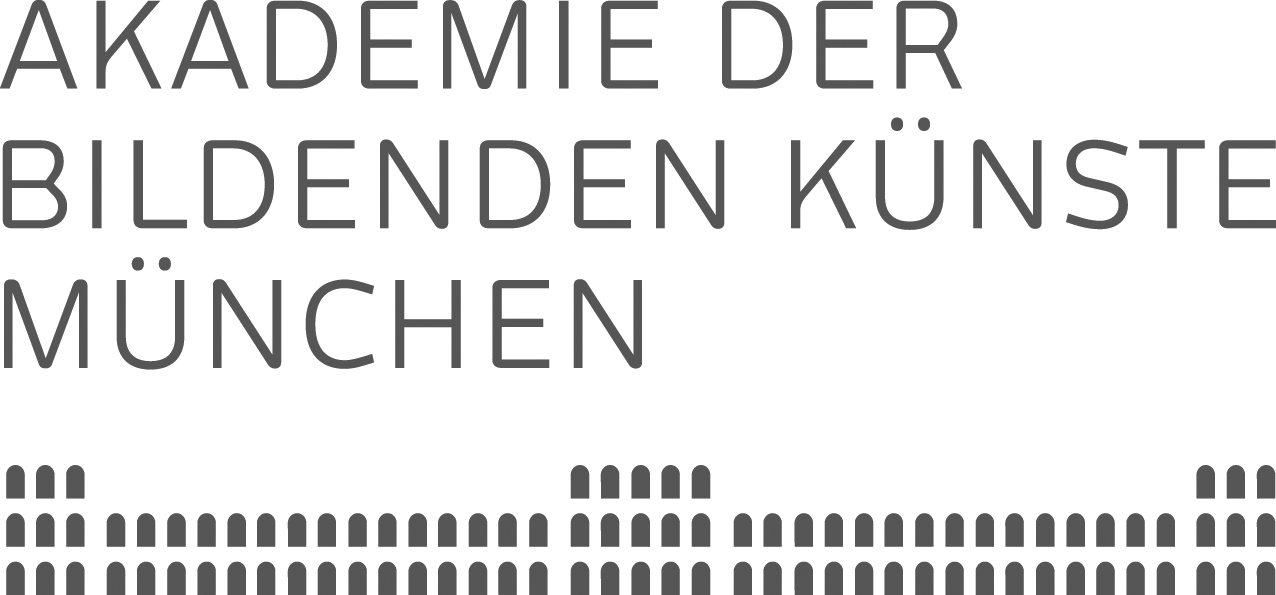

The Academy of Fine Arts, Munich (German: Akademie der Bildenden Künste München, also known as the Munich Academy) is one of the oldest and most significant art academies in Germany. It is located in the Maxvorstadt district of Munich, in Bavaria, Germany.

In the second half of the 19th century, the academy became one of the most important institutions in Europe for training artists and attracted students from across Europe and the United States.

== History ==
The history of the academy goes back to 1770 with the founding by Elector Maximilian III. Joseph, of a "drawing school", the "Zeichnungs Schule respective Maler und Bildhauer Academie". In 1808, under King Maximilian I Joseph of Bavaria, it became the Royal Academy of Fine Arts. The curriculum focused was on painting, graphics, sculpture and architecture.

The Munich School refers to a group of painters who worked in Munich or were trained at the Academy between 1850 and 1918. The paintings are characterized by a naturalistic style and dark chiaroscuro. Typical painting subjects included landscape, portraits, genre, still-life, and history. Karl von Piloty, the foremost representative of the realistic school in Germany, became director in 1874.

From 1900 to 1918 the academy's director was Ferdinand Freiherr von Miller. During the Second World War, Hitler replaced the academy's "non-Aryan" professors with Nazi artists. In 1946, the Royal Academy of Fine Arts was merged with the School of arts and crafts and the School of applied arts. In 1953, its name was changed to the current Academy of Fine Arts.

== Buildings ==
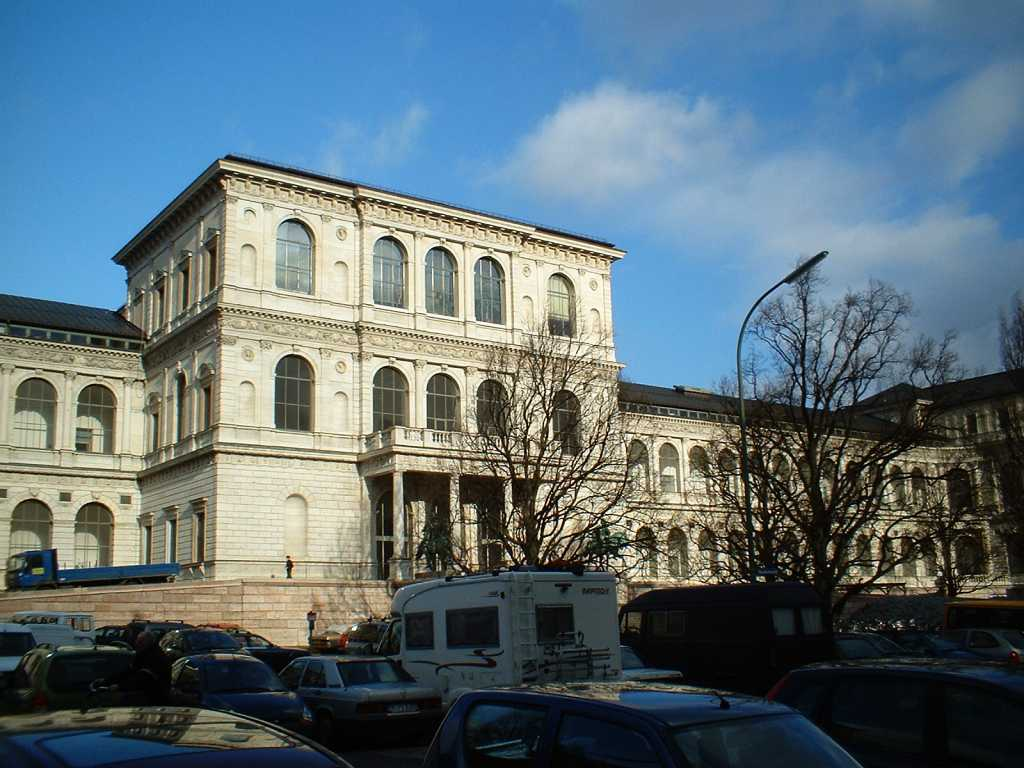
Renaissance Revival style facade (1886).

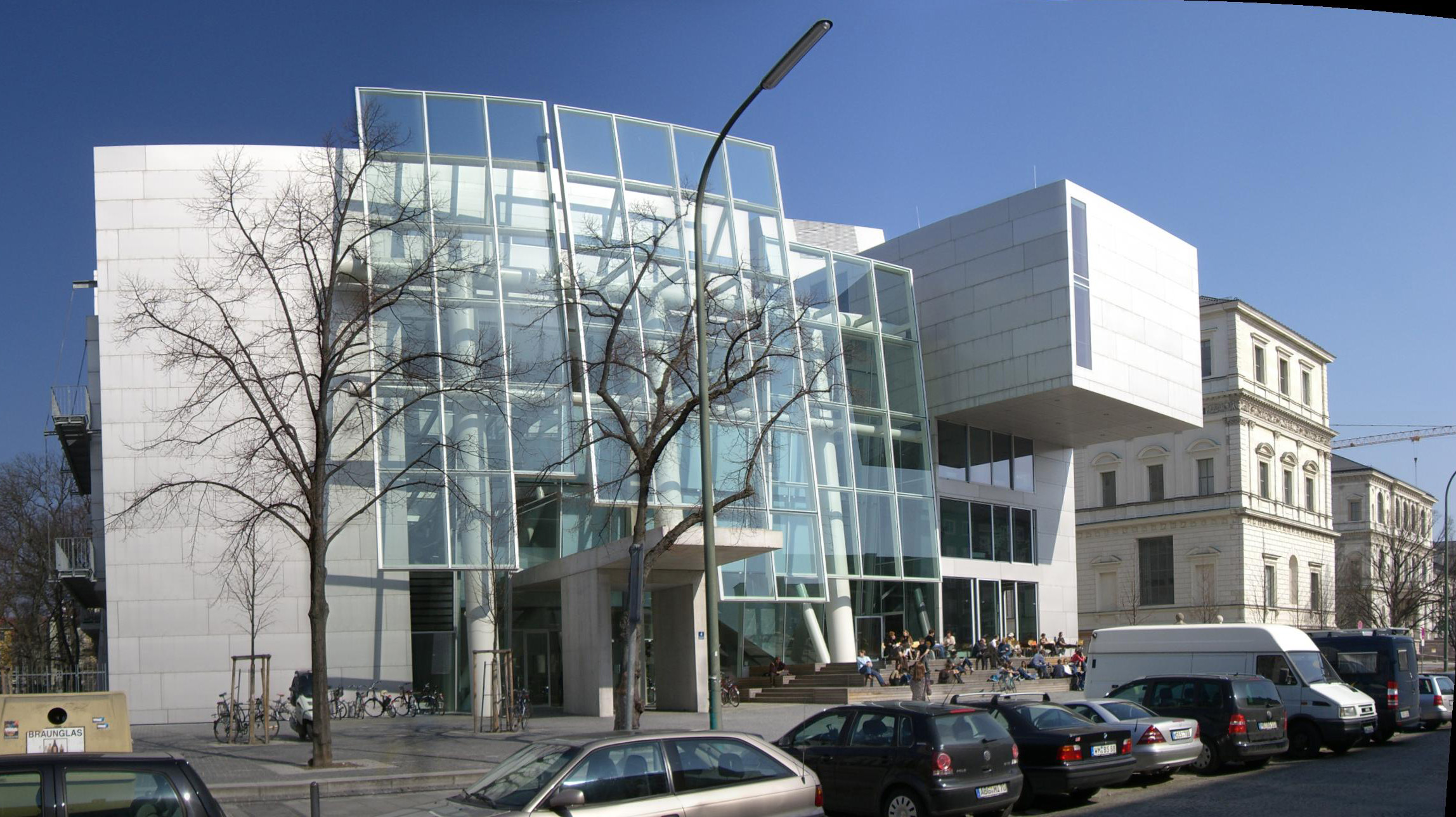
Deconstructivist expansion, designed by Coop Himmelb(l)au (2005).

The large 19th-century Renaissance Revival style building complex, designed by Gottfried Neureuther, was completed in 1886. It has housed the Academy since then.

A new Deconstructivist style expansion, designed by the architectural firm Coop Himmelb(l)au as an extension from the original building, was completed in 2005.

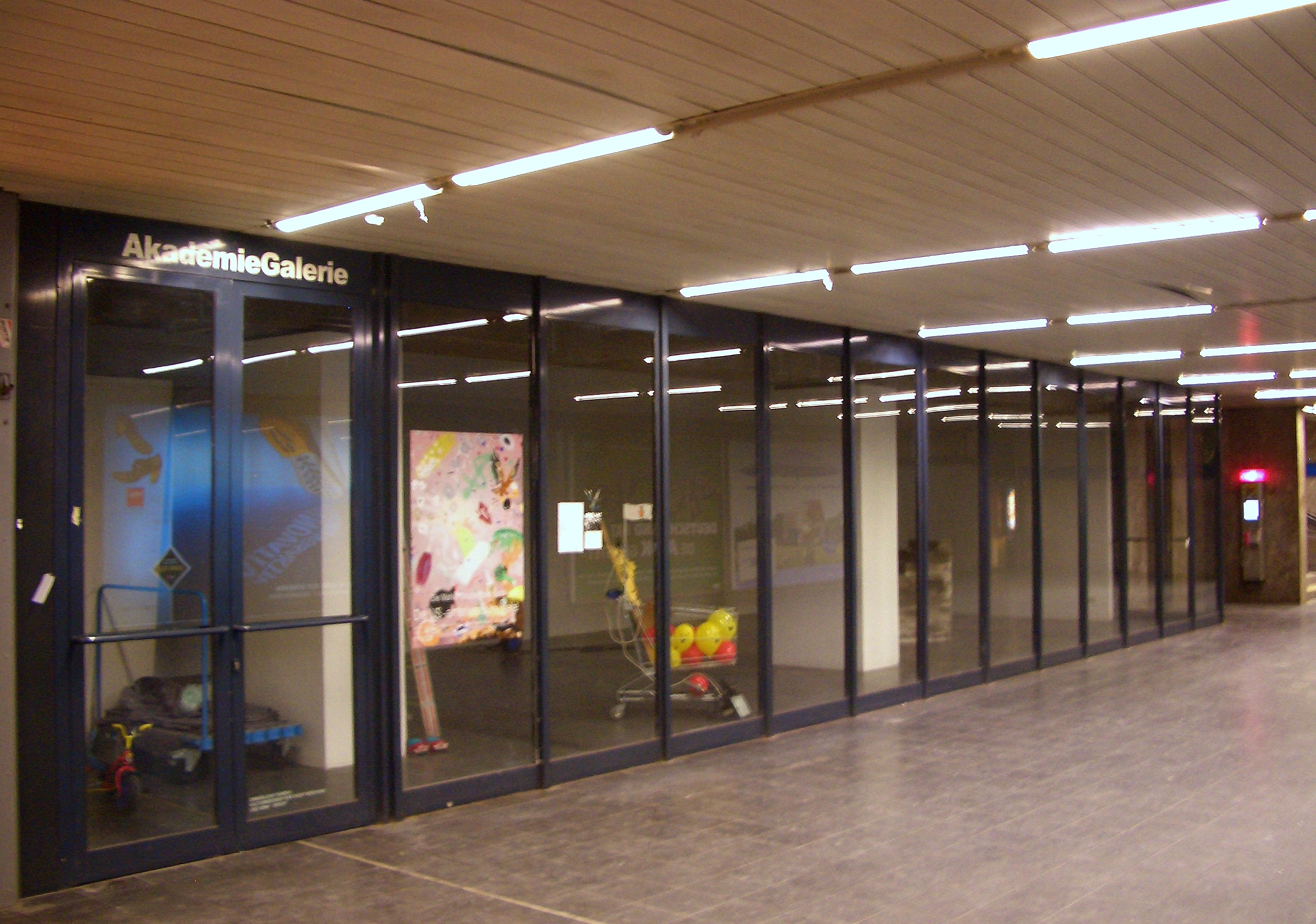
AkademieGalerie exhibition space

The AkademieGalerie, 'gallery of the academy' is located at the nearby subway station Universität. It opened in 1989 as an experiment; since then students have exhibited over 350 works in a variety of media that were created specifically for this location.

== Study ==
The Academy of Fine Arts, Munich offers undergraduate and graduate programs in the fields of fine arts, art education, interior architecture, and related disciplines. The institution emphasizes a class-based teaching model, where students are assigned to specific classes led by professors, each representing distinct artistic approaches. This structure is complemented by interdisciplinary seminars, lectures, and access to specialized workshops.

=== Undergraduate programs ===
- Fine Arts (Diploma): This program encompasses various disciplines, including painting, sculpture, photography, graphic arts, media art, performance, jewelry and hollowware, scenography, and stage costume design. Students are assigned to one of approximately 25 classes, each led by a professor with a unique artistic focus.
- Art Education (State Examination): Designed for those intending to teach art at the secondary school level, this program combines practical artistic training with pedagogical studies.
- Interior Architecture (Bachelor of Arts): A three-year program focusing on the design and conceptualization of interior spaces, integrating artistic and technical aspects.

=== Graduate programs ===
- Interior Architecture (Master of Arts): A two-year consecutive program that builds upon the bachelor's degree, emphasizing advanced design concepts and research in interior architecture.
- Architecture and Art (Master of Arts): This program explores the intersection of architectural design and artistic expression, fostering interdisciplinary approaches.
- Fine Arts and Therapy (Master of Arts): Combining artistic practice with therapeutic methodologies, this program prepares students for careers in art therapy.

== Teaching ==
The study at the Academy is organized in class associations. Overall, the Academy accommodates twenty-three classes, led by professors, who each stand for an individual approach to contemporary fine art. These classes are complemented by twenty study workshops and a library, as well as seminars and lectures in art science, philosophy and didactics.

The following study programs are offered:

- Free Art (Diploma)
- Art Education (State Examination and Master Degree)
- Interior Architecture (Bachelor and Master Degree)
- Architecture (Master Degree)
- Art Therapy (Master Degree)

== Admission ==
Admission to the Academy's programs typically requires the submission of a portfolio demonstrating artistic aptitude. Successful applicants are invited to participate in practical and oral examinations. Proficiency in the German language is generally expected, as most courses are taught in German.

== People ==
=== Notable professors ===
- Lawrence Alma-Tadema
- Hermann Anschütz
- Anton Ažbe (1884–1885)
- Nikolaus Gysis
- Peter von Cornelius
- Res Ingold
- Max Klinger
- Franz von Lenbach
- Walter Maurer (1990–2000)
- Robin Page (1981–1998)
- Eduardo Paolozzi (1981–1989)
- Sean Scully
- Jacob Ungerer (1890–1920)
- Arthur von Ramberg
- Gerd Winner (born 1936)
- Heinrich Kirchner
- Hito Steyerl
- Heinrich von Zugel

=== Notable students ===
- Josef Albers (1919–1920)
- Mainbocher
- Franz Ackermann (1984–1988)
- Erwin Aichele
- Henry Alexander
- Cuno Amiet (1886–1888)
- Henry Baerer (1837–1908)
- Octav Băncilă
- Vladimir Becić
- René Beeh
- Ul de Rico
- Ignat Bednarik
- Claus Bergen
- Robert Julius Beyschlag
- Friedrich Brugger
- Harry Chase
- William Merritt Chase
- Giorgio de Chirico
- Albert Chmielowski
- Susanne Clausen
- Lovis Corinth (1880–1884)
- William Jacob Baer (1880–1884)
- Menci Clement Crnčić
- Thomas Demand
- Samuel Friedrich Diez
- Edgar Downs (1876–1963; silver medallist)
- Frank Duveneck
- Alex Dzigurski (1911–1995)
- Valentin Peter Feuerstein (1917–1999)
- Lothar Fischer (1952–1958)
- Günther Förg
- Wilhelm Heinrich Funk (born 1866), (an American portrait painter)
- Oskar Garvens (1874–1951)
- Karl Gatermann the Younger
- Herbjørn Gausta
- Dimitrios Geraniotis (1871–1966), Greek portrait painter
- Aleksander Gierymski (1846–1874)
- Maksymilian Gierymski (1850–1901)
- Louis Grell (1887–1960)
- Rita Grosse-Ruyken (1971–1977)
- Nicholaos Gysis (1842–1901)
- Karl Michael Haider (1846–1912)
- Herman Hartwich (1853–1926)
- Hermann Helmer
- Oskar Herman
- George Herzog
- Louis Christian Hess
- Peter von Hess
- Hallgrímur Helgason (born 1959)
- Friedrich Hohe (1802–1870)
- Elmyr de Hory (1906–1976)
- Jörg Immendorff (1984–1985)
- Vincas Jomantas (1946–1948) sculptor
- Đorđe Jovanović (sculptor)
- Wassily Kandinsky (1866–1944)
- Paul Wilhelm Keller-Reutlingen (1854–1920)
- Elena Nikandrovna Klokacheva (1871)
- Robert Koehler (1873–1875; 1879–1886 bronze and silver medalist)
- Elisaveta Konsulova-Vazova (1881–1965)
- Alfred Kowalski
- Miroslav Kraljević
- Alfred Kubin (1899)
- Paul Klee (1900)
- Wilhelm Leibl
- Maximilian Liebenwein (1869—1926)
- Richard Lindner (1925–1927)
- Melissa Logan
- Ştefan Luchian
- Mahirwan Mamtani (1935)
- Franz Marc (1900–1903)
- Jan Matejko
- Dieter Mathoi (1963–1967)
- János Mattis-Teutsch
- Mato Celestin Medović (1890–1893)
- Vadim Meller
- Josef Moroder-Lusenberg (1876–1880)
- Alphonse Mucha
- Otto Mueller
- John Mulvany (1839–1906)
- Adolfo Müller-Ury (1881–1882)
- Edvard Munch
- Alex Murray-Leslie
- Hubert Netzer (1865–1939)
- Elisabet Ney (1981–1989)
- Eduard Niczky (1850–1919)
- Charles Henry Niehaus (1855–1935)
- Thomas Satterwhite Noble (1881–1883)
- Markus Oehlen (2002–)
- Paul Ondrusch
- Ernst Oppler
- Fritz Osswald
- Ulrike Ottinger (born 1942)
- Bruno Paul
- Carl Theodor von Piloty
- Edward Henry Potthast
- Otto Quante (1875–1947)
- Josip Račić (1905–1908)
- Robert Hermann Raudner (1854–1915)
- Richard Riemerschmid (1888–1890)
- Léo-Paul Robert (1869)
- Franz Roubaud
- Anna May-Rychter (1864–1955)
- Sep Ruf
- Heinrich Schlitt
- Karl Saltzmann (1896–1923)
- Barbara Seidenath (born 1960), metalsmith, jeweler.
- Günther Schneider-Siemssen (1926–2015), scenic designer
- Walter Shirlaw
- Edith Soterius von Sachsenheim (1887–1970)
- Karina Smigla-Bobinski
- Emil Span
- T. C. Steele
- Vardges Sureniants (1860–1921)
- Johann Gottfried Steffan
- Franz von Stuck
- Willy Tiedjen
- Nicolae Tonitza
- Axel Törneman (1880–1925)
- John Henry Twachtman
- Petar Ubavkić (1852–1910)
- Spyridon Vikatos (1878–1960)
- Robert Voit (born 1969)
- Lascăr Vorel
- Alexander von Wagner (1869–1910)
- Henrik Weber (1818–1866)
- Sybilla Mittell Weber (1892–1957)
- Barbara Zeigler
- Hans-Peter Zimmer
- Tadeusz Zukotynski (1877–1912)
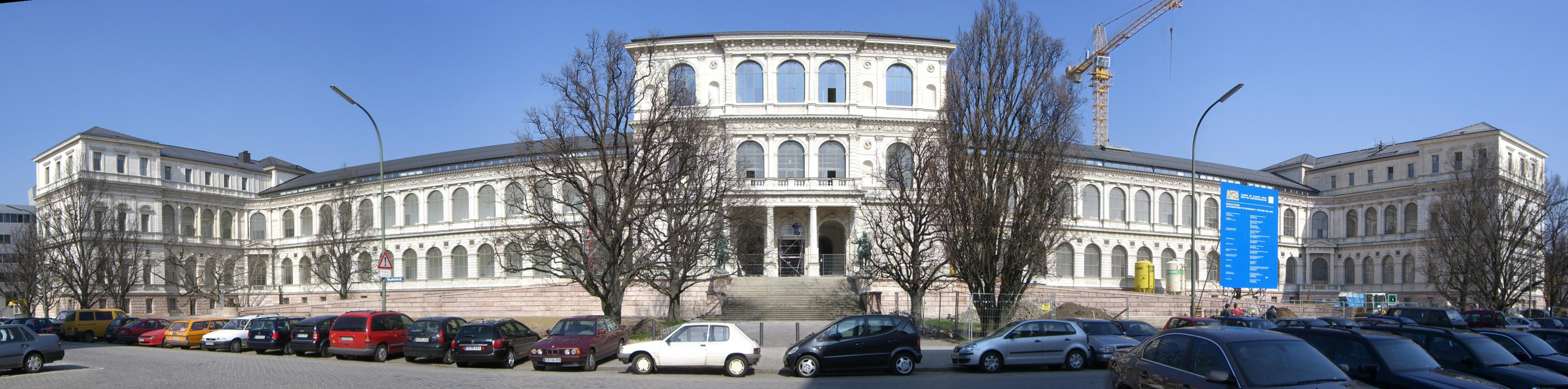
Panoramic view of the 1886 Academy of Fine Arts building

== See also ==
- Greek academic art of the 19th century
- Academic realism
