= The Dictionary of Indian Art and Artists =

The Dictionary of Indian Art and Artists, written by Pratima Sheth (an artist based in Mumbai), is a reference work pertaining to Indian art and artists. The reference book took about 12 years of researching for collection, compiling, and consolidating the relevant information from the Indus art to the Indian art of the present time. The works covers different aspects of art including painting, sculpture, printmaking, weaving, and embroidery. The dictionary has over 1,300 entries, and more than 300 color illustrations.

The book contains a number of informative articles including the following:

- "History of Indian Art" by Aban Amroliwala
- "Art & Nationalism in Colonial India: The First Phase (1850–1922)" by Patha Mitter
- "Preservation of Art Objects" by O.P. Agarwal

The book was published by Mapin Publishing in 2006.
