= Bangkok University Gallery =

Museum in Bangkok, Thailand

Bangkok University Gallery or BUG is a museum in Bangkok, Thailand.

The Bangkok University Gallery is a private two-floor gallery on Bangkok University's Kluai Nam Thai campus. It is described by Bangkok Art Map as "one of Bangkok's biggest and best".
