= Heinrich Schlitt =

German painter and illustrator

Heinrich Schlitt (August 21, 1849 – November 13, 1923) was a German painter and illustrator, known for his fantasy motifs that feature gnomes, dwarves, and faeries. He was one of the in-house artists at the Villeroy & Boch ceramic company in Mettlach, Saarland, and his designs for their beer steins remain popular with collectors to this day.

== Early life ==
Schlitt was born in Wiesbaden in the Duchy of Nassau, what would now be in the modern day German state of Hesse. His father was a member of the court of the Duke of Nassau, working as a coachman. After the Prussian annexation of the Duchy, Schlitt joined the Dutch military, a choice thought to be the result of the Schlitt family moving to the Netherlands with the rest of the exiled Duchy.

Schlitt was a student of Kaspar Kögler at his school in Wiesbaden. In 1875, he continued his studies at the Academy of Fine Arts in Munich under Wilhelm Lindenschmit the Younger. He exhibited his works at exhibitions put on by the Munich Artists' Cooperative.

== Works ==
=== Illustrator ===
Early in his career, Schlitt first became well known to the public as an illustrator. He produced hundreds of illustrations for a wide array of publications, including books, periodicals, and newspapers such as Die Gartenlaube, Das Buch Für Alle, and Illustrirte Zeitung.

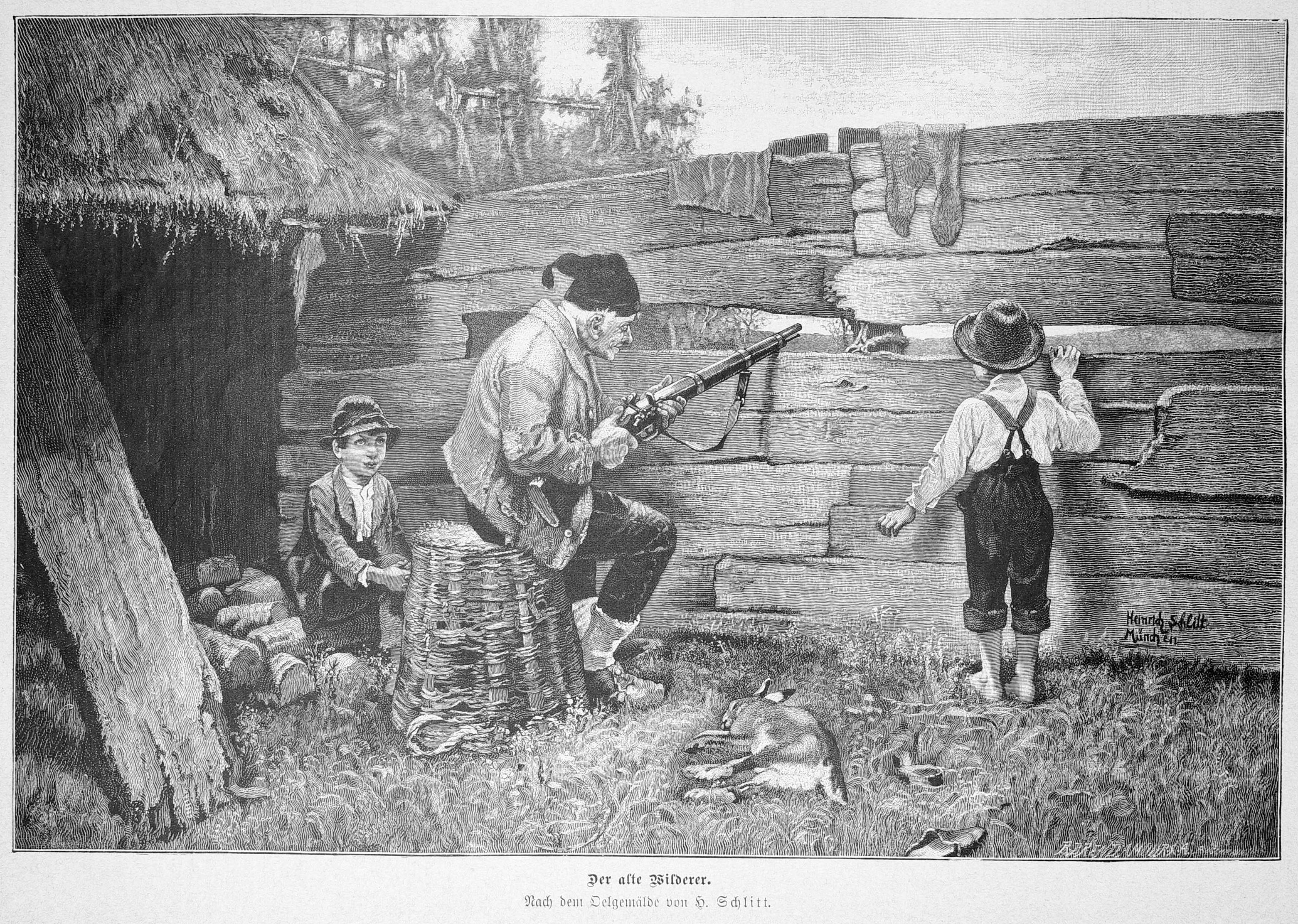
"The Old Poacher" from Die Gartenlaube, 1887

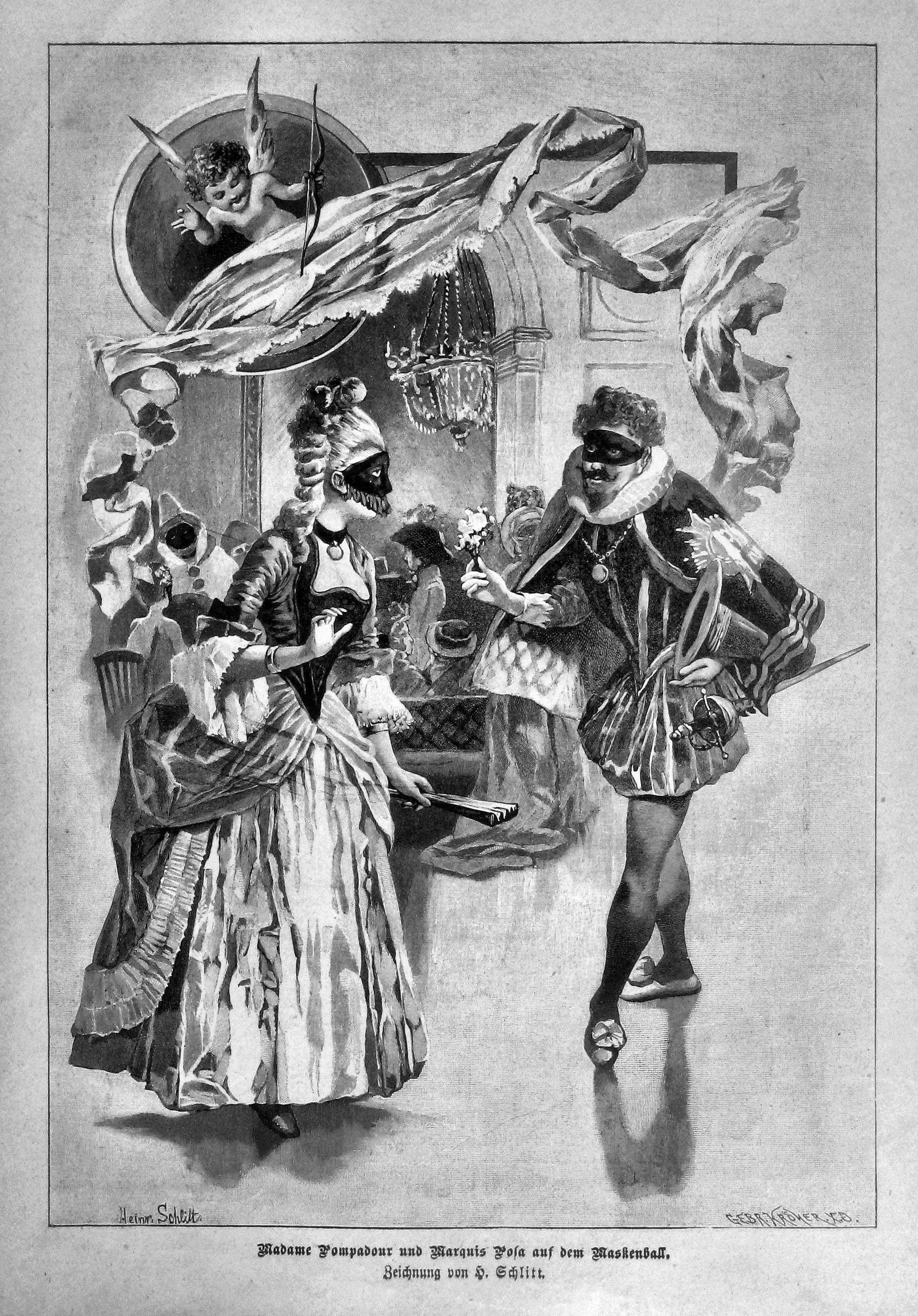
"Madame Pompadour and Marquis Posa at the masquerade ball" from Die Gartenlaube, 1890

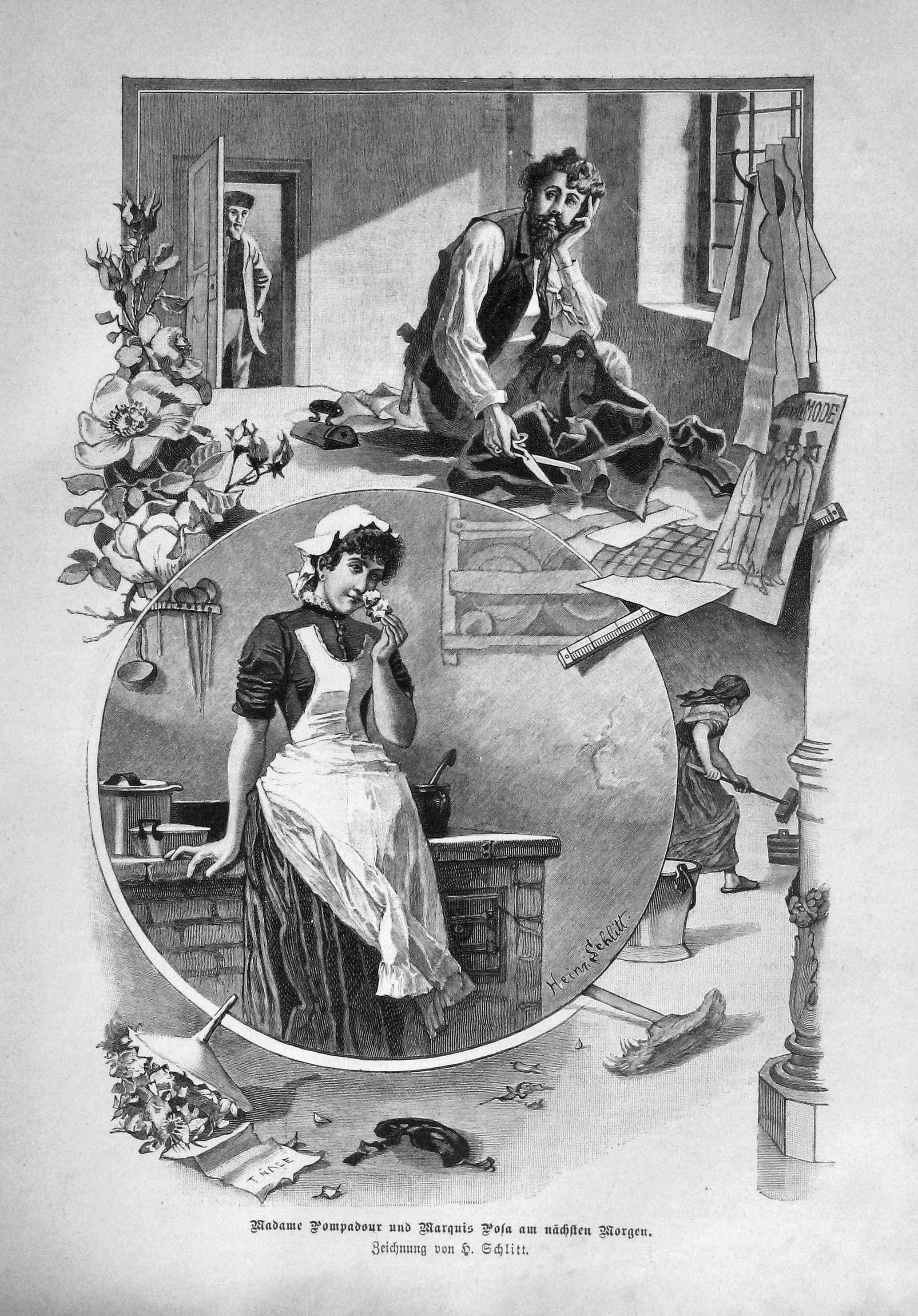
"Madame Pompadour and Marquis Posa the next morning" from Die Gartenlaube, 1890

=== Ratskeller of the Munich New Town Hall ===
In 1905, Schlitt was selected by architect Georg von Hauberrisser to paint the ceilings of the Ratskeller at the New Town Hall in Munich. The paintings were originally intended to adorn the walls of the St. Johann Town Hall ratskeller, but after disputes between the municipal administration of St. Johann and Schlitt regarding payment for the works, Schlitt withdrew from the project and instead used the concepts for the paintings in the Munich Ratskeller. The paintings are considered to be some of his finest works.

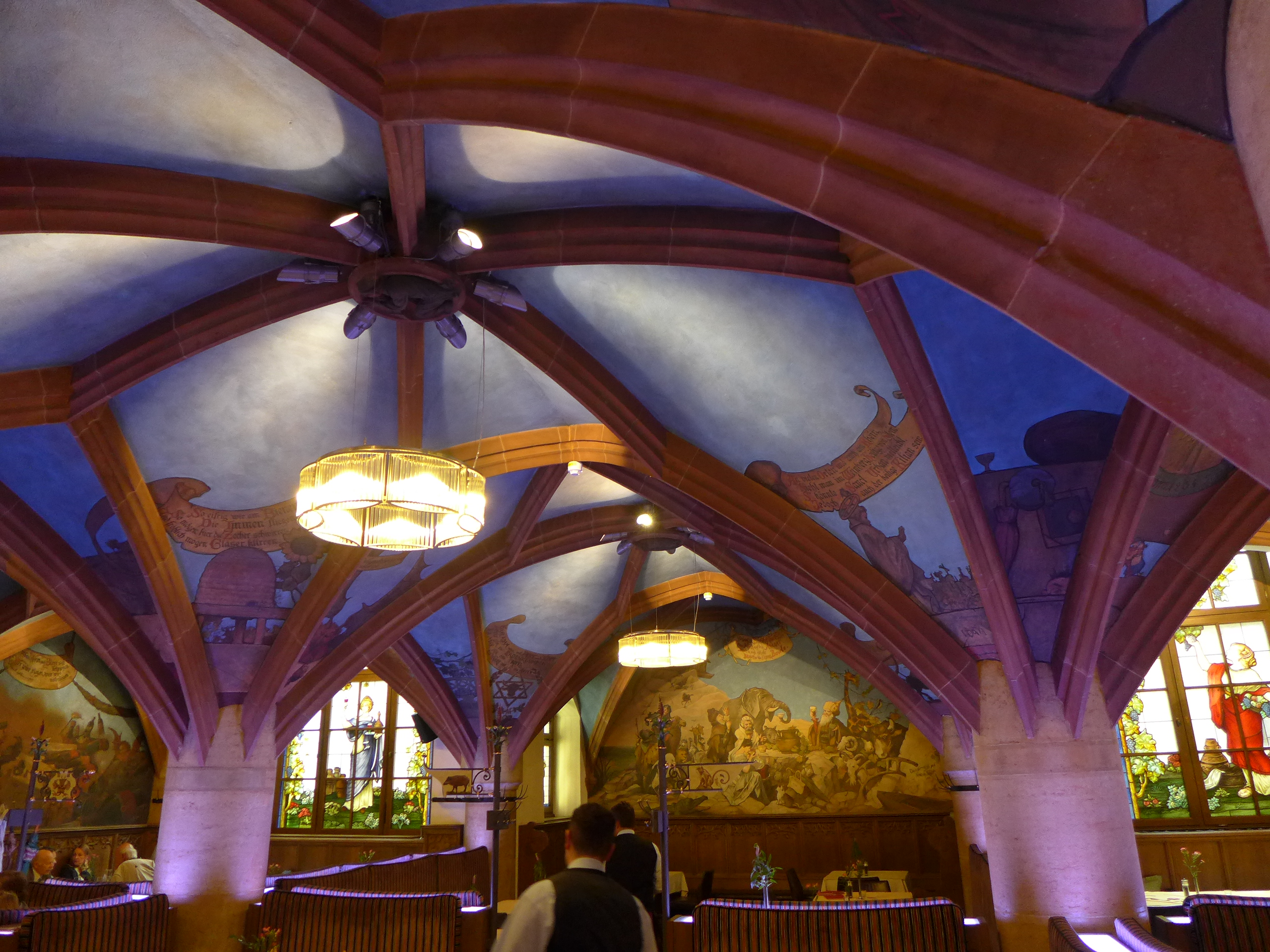
Vault painting

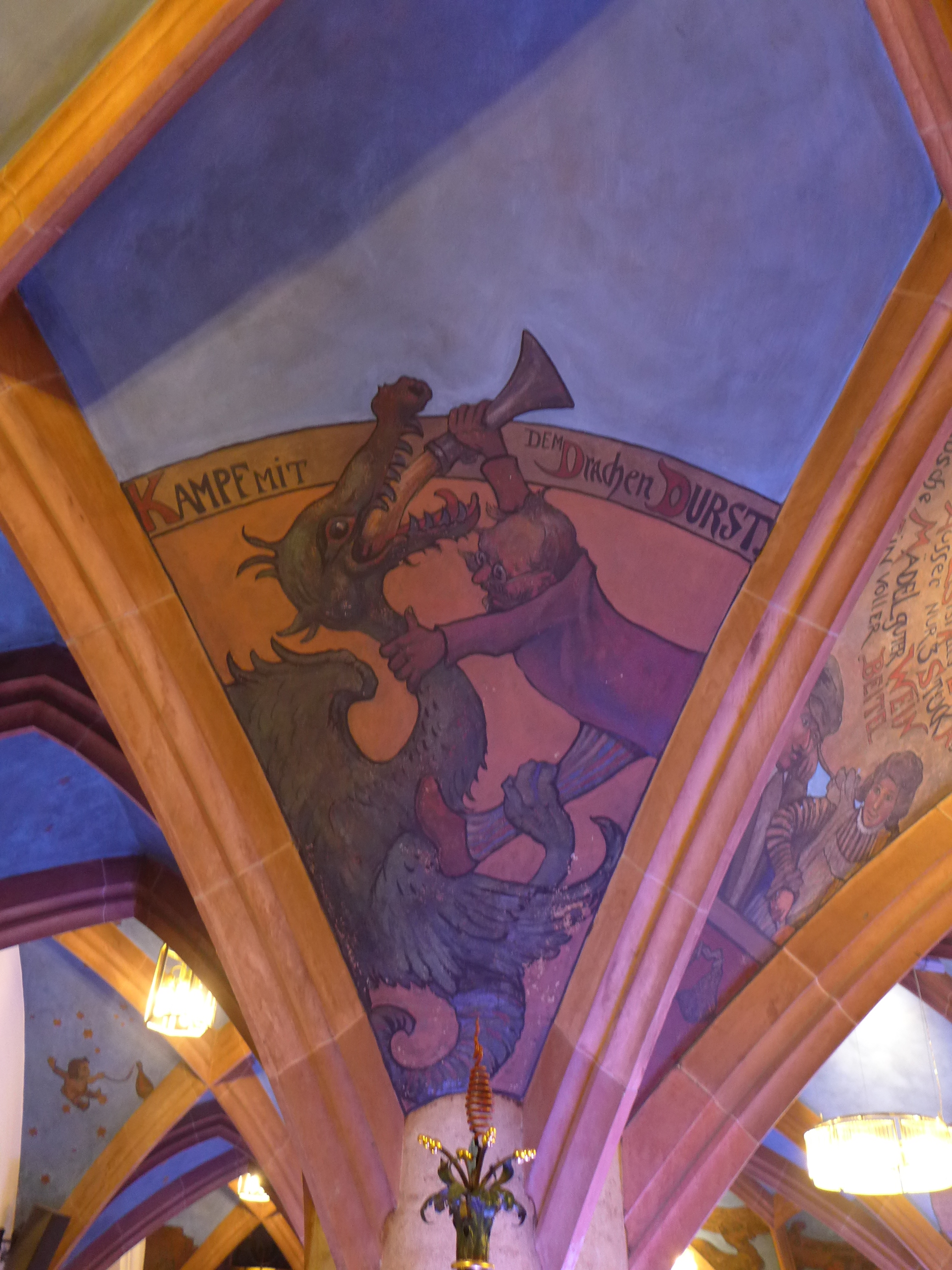
Detail of the vault painting

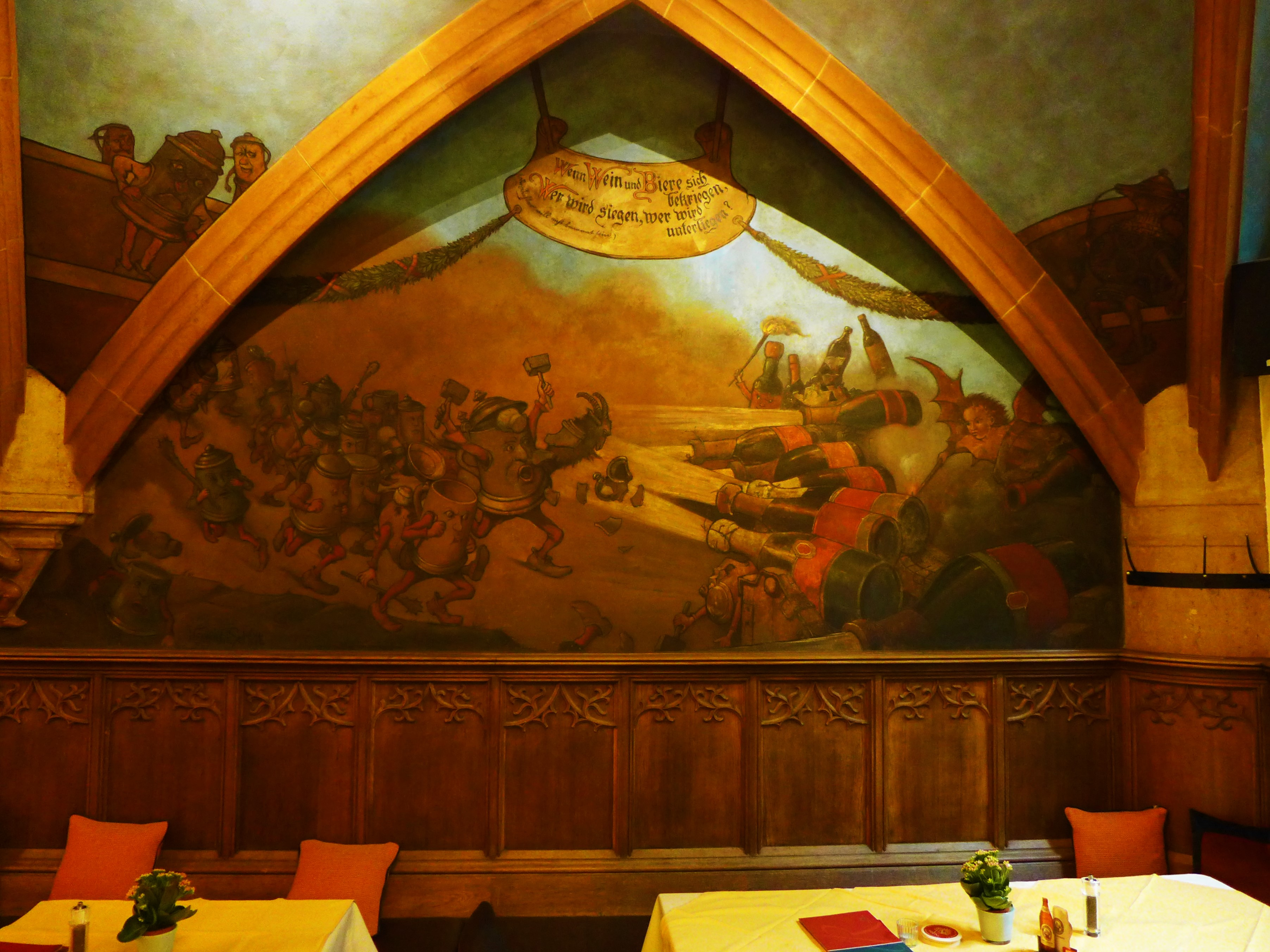
When wine and beers are fighting ..., Wall painting in the Ratskeller

=== Villeroy & Boch ===
Heinrich Schlitt was one of the principal in-house artists at Villeroy & Boch, a German ceramics manufacturer based in Mettlach. His work for the company is prominently featured on beer steins that they produced during the period, which are well known and held in renown amongst modern-day collectors of steins and ceramics.

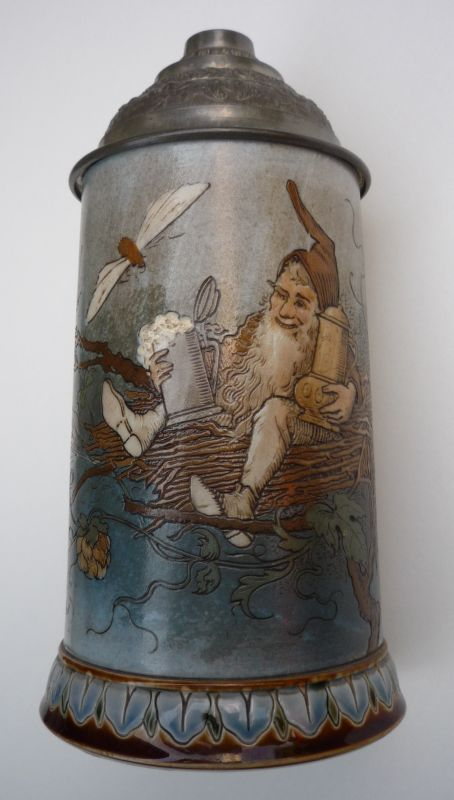
Stoneware design by Schlitt, produced by Villeroy & Boch
