= Gagillapur =

- Village
- Location within Telangana
- Coordinates: 18.2259°N 79.0737°E
- Country: India
- State: Telangana
- District: Siddipet
- Subdistrict: Bejjanki

Population
  - Total: 1,618
- Time zone: UTC+05:30 (IST)
- Pincode: 505528

.

Gagillapur is a village in Bejjanki mandal, Siddipet district, Telangana, India. It is located on the bank of the Moyaduthummeda River and has a population of 1,618.
