= Rabengrund =

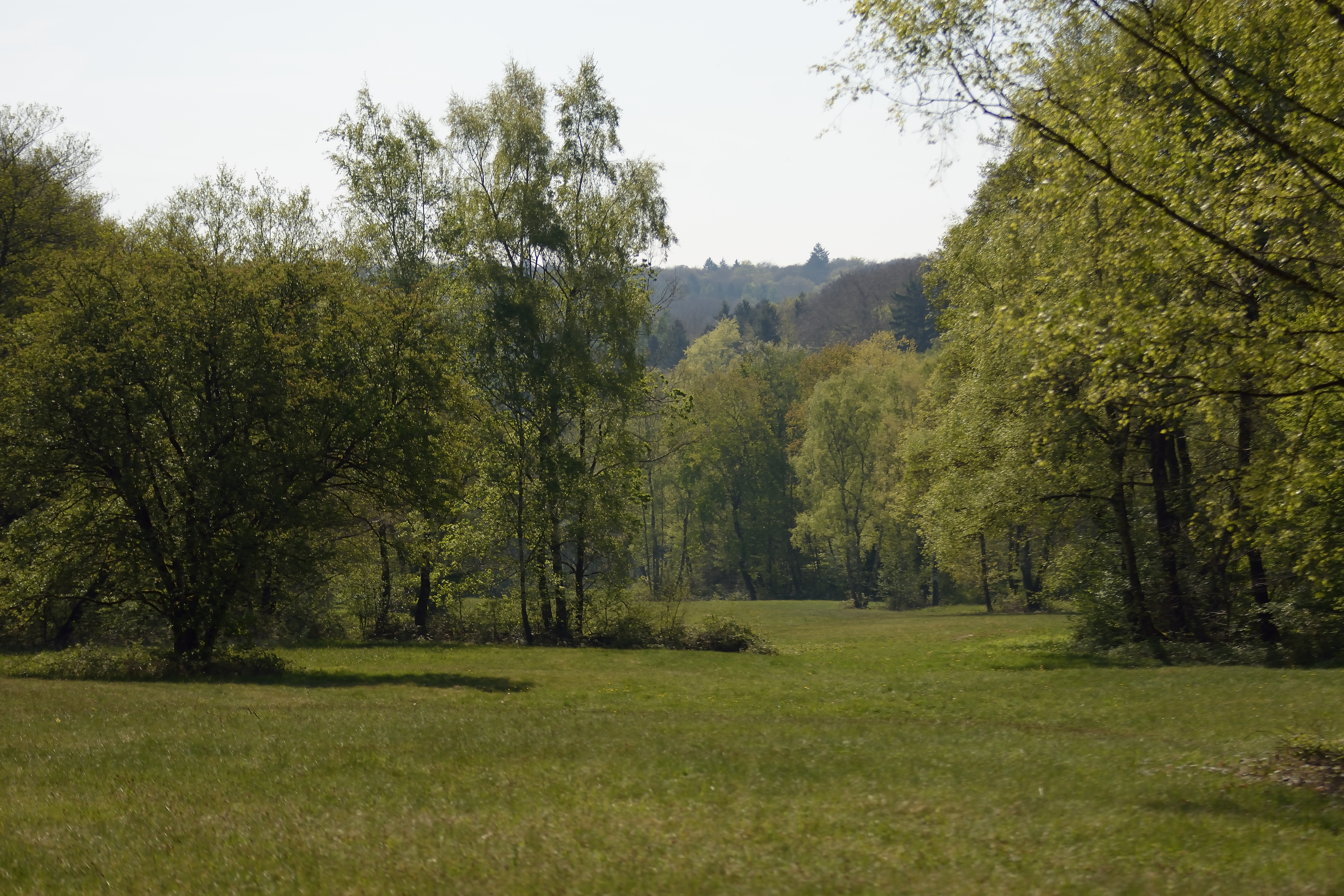
- Meadoes in Rabengrund
- Interactive map of Rabengrund
- Nearest city: Wiesbaden
- Coordinates: 50°06′58″N 8°13′26″E
- Area: 79.05 ha (195.3 acres)
- Established: 22 March 1988

Der Rabengrund, officially Rabengrund von Wiesbaden, is a recreation area, Naturschutzgebiet and Special Area of Conservation in Wiesbaden, the capital of Hesse, Germany, established in 1988.

== Geography ==
The protected area is in Wiesbaden-Nordost, part of Wiesbaden-Sonnenberg, south of the Platte. East of the area is the spring of the Goldsteinbach and the protected area Goldsteintal. The area is close to the city and also used by bicyclist, riders and people using model planes, causing ecologival stress.

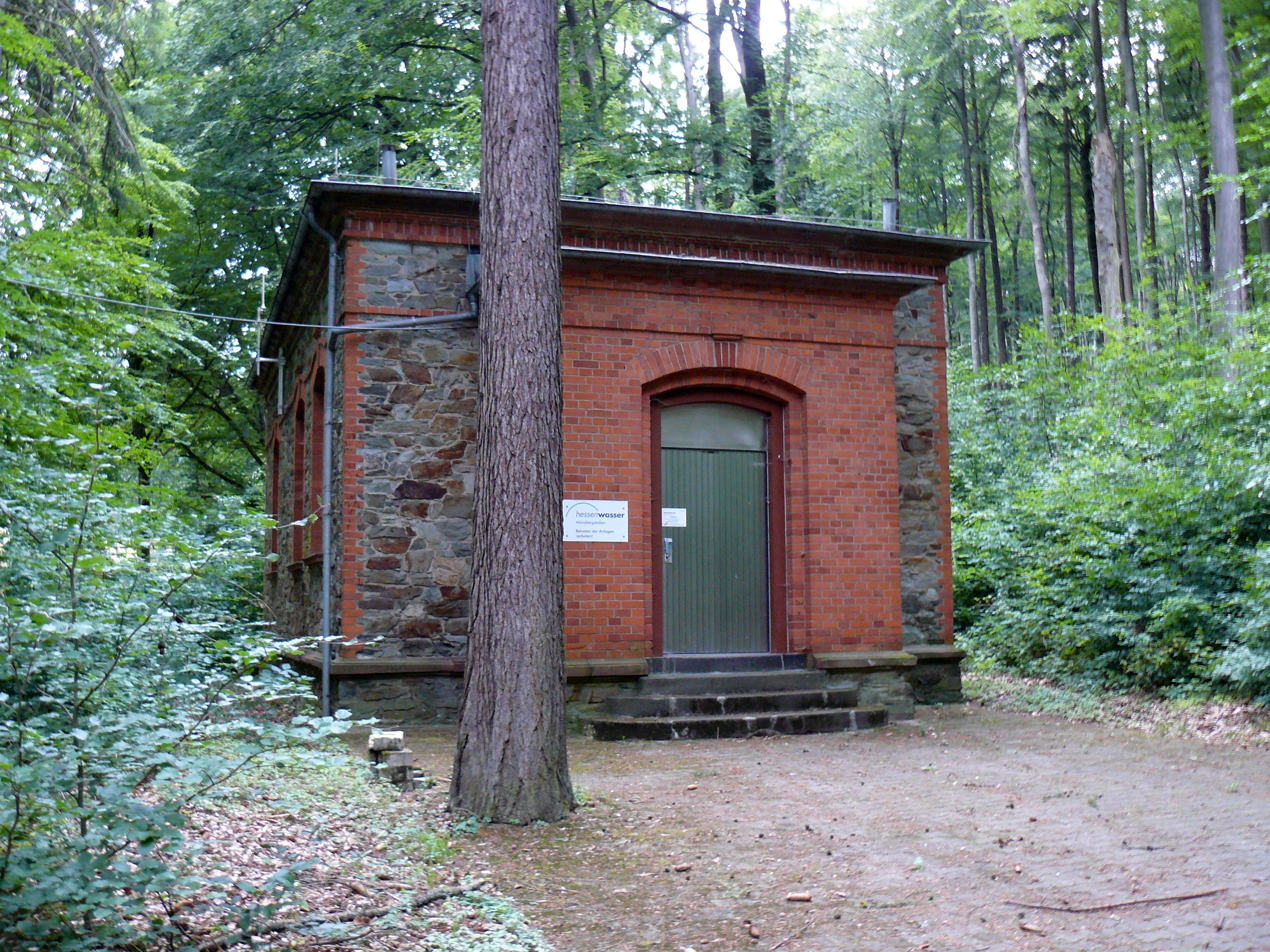
Münzbergstollen

The Rabengrund is part of a Wasserschutzgebiet, as the historic Münzbergstollen of 1890 supplies drinking water from the Taunus for Wiesbaden.

The average temperature in the Rabengrund is about 10 °C, the average rainfall 600–650 mm.

== Nature preservation ==
The nature preserve of 79.05 hectares (195.3 acres) was protected on 22 March 1988.

The meadows of the area go back to agriculture in Roman times. Nature preservation aims at retaining some rare plants which attract rare animals. The area features dry meadows on acid soil, meadows of false oat grass and of Molinia, beech forests and reed beds. Floweing plants include orchids such as Dactylorhiza majalis, Anacamptis morio, Neotinea ustulata and Platanthera bifolia; the Dactylorhiza viridis has its only place in the Taunus here.

A geological circle path accesses the area. Rabengrund is maintained by the Chausseehaus of Hessen-Forst.
