= Herman Hartwich =

German-American painter

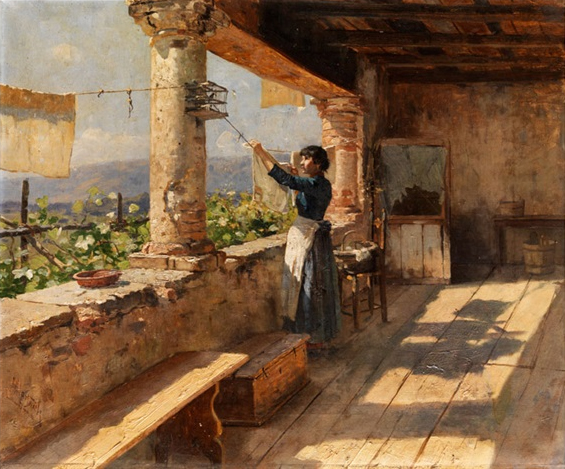
Young Italian girl in a loggia hanging up laundry

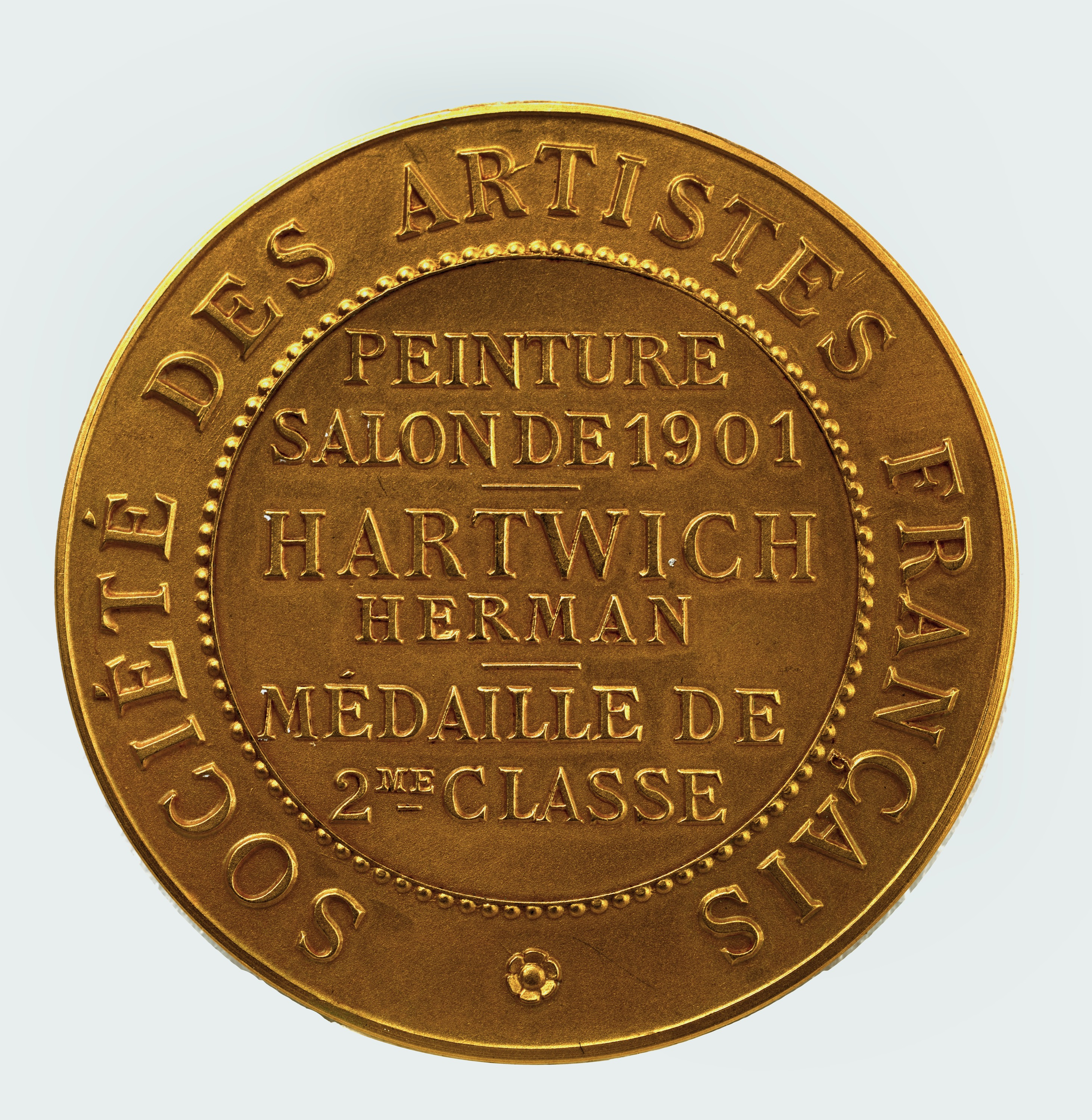
Medal won by Hartwich at the Salon des artistes français, Paris, 1901

Herman Hartwich (or Hartwick; July 8, 1853 – March 8, 1926) was a German-American landscape and genre painter.

Allgemeines Künstlerlexikon called him a figure painter; painter; landscape painter; animal painter. Herringshaw's American Blue Book of Biography mentions him as a painter and engraver.

Hartwich, who was born, in New York City, studied painting from 1881 to 1885 at Academy of Fine Arts, Munich. His work appears in the 1883, 1888, 1889, 1890, and 1891 catalogs of art exhibitions in Munich Glass Palace. In 1892 and 1901, he won a prize in Paris. He returned to New York in 1894, but eventually settled in Munich sometime before his death in 1926.

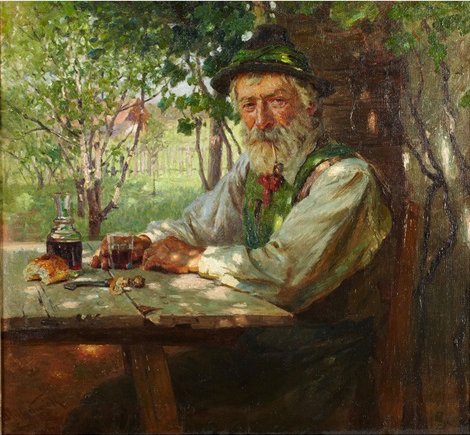
Resting in a sunlit garden

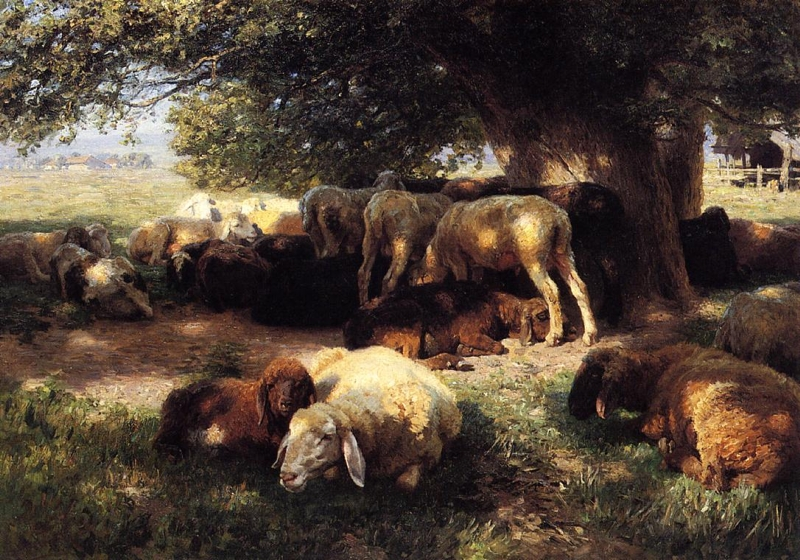
Midday Rest
