= Neuland Laboratories =

Indian pharmaceutical company

- Trade name: NSE: NEULANDLAB; BSE : 524558
- Type: Public
- Industry: CDMO
- Founded: January 7 1984
- Founders: Dr. Davuluri Rama Mohan Rao
- Headquarters: Hyderabad, India
- Area served: North America, Switzerland, UK, Germany, Italy and the Netherlands and 80 more countries.
- Key people: Dr. Davuluri Rama Mohan Rao (Executive Chairman); D. Sucheth Rao (Executive Vice Chairman); D. Saharsh Rao (Chief Executive Officer & Managing Director)
- Revenue: ₹2,053.1 crore (FY2025-26)
- Number of employees: ~2,300 (including 450+ R&D experts)
- Website: www.neulandlabs.com

Neuland Laboratories Limited is an Indian publicly listed contract development and manufacturing organization (CDMO) headquartered in Hyderabad. Founded in 1984, the company produces active pharmaceutical ingredients (APIs), advanced intermediates, and peptide APIs. Its shares are traded on the Bombay Stock Exchange and the National Stock Exchange.

== Overview ==
Neuland operates through two primary business verticals: Generic Drug Substances (GDS) and CDMO services. Its operations span process research and development, custom synthesis, scale-up, regulatory documentation support, and commercial manufacturing.

The company exports products to more than 80 countries and maintains approvals from major international regulatory authorities, including the United States Food and Drug Administration (US FDA), European Directorate for the Quality of Medicines (EDQM), and Japan’s Pharmaceuticals and Medical Devices Agency (PMDA).

As of 2026, Neuland employs approximately 2,300 people, including over 450 engaged in research and development activities.

For the full financial year 2026, the company surpassed ₹2000 crore in total revenue for the first time (approximately US $215 million. In the fourth quarter of FY2026, EBITDA increased by nearly 449% year-on-year to 319.4 crore (US$33 million), with an EBITDA margin of 40%. Profit after tax for the quarter stood at ₹212.5 crore (approximately US$22 million)

== Product development ==
The company's operations are divided into three segments: Custom Manufacturing Solutions, which develops APIs from pre-clinical to commercial stages; Generic Drug Substances, which manufactures non-exclusive APIs; and a Peptide API unit that specializes in peptide synthesis.

== Facilities ==
Neuland Laboratories operates multiple world-class facilities supporting active pharmaceutical ingredient (API), intermediate, and peptide production.

- Unit I – Bonthapally: The primary manufacturing hub situated in Bonthapally village, Medak District, Telangana, with multiple production blocks including kilo labs and quality assurance laboratories. It holds approvals from major regulatory agencies and supports commercial API production.
- Unit II – Pashamylaram: A large-scale manufacturing facility comprising multiple production blocks, an engineering workshop, and warehouses.
- Unit III – Gaddapotharam: A multi-product facility designed for advanced intermediates and APIs, with analytical development and pilot plant capabilities.
- R&D Centre – Bonthapally: Research and development centre with a team of approximately 360 scientists, pilot labs, and analytical capabilities to catalyze process development and technology transfer.

== New Peptide Facility ==
Neuland Laboratories has inagurated a new commercial peptide manufacturing facility at its 17- acre Bonthapally manufacturing campus in August 2026. The project is part of a phased expansion, with additional capacity planned in line with growing client demand. The first of four modules is now operational, adding commercial scale capabilities to its existing peptide manufacturing infrastructure.

The new peptide manufacturing facility will feature digitalized operations supported by distributed control system (DCS) automation and electronic batch‑record platforms. It is also designed with expanded purification and drying infrastructure, including multi‑column preparative HPLC systems, large‑scale lyophilizers, enhanced solvent‑handling capabilities, and upgraded waste‑management processes. These features are intended to support consistent batch quality and more efficient production cycles.
