= Gummadidala =

- mandal
- Location within Telangana Location within India
- Coordinates: 17.683°N 78.37°E
- Country: India
- State: Telangana
- District: sangareddy

Government
  - Type: People Government

Languages
  - Official: Telugu
- Time zone: UTC+5:30 (IST)
- PIN: 502313
- Telephone code: 918458-
- Vehicle registration: TG-15
- Sex ratio: 48:52 ♂/♀
- Lok Sabha constituency: Medak Lok Sabha constituency
- MedakVidhan Sabha constituency: Patancheru Assembly constituency
- Website: telangana.gov.in

Gummadidala is a mandal in Sangareddy district of Telangana, India.
