= Peter Hartwig (painter) =

Dutch painter

Peter Hartwig (Hoogezand, May 19, 1963) is a Dutch painter.

Hartwig studied at the Academie Minerva in Groningen, Netherlands. He mainly works with oil-on-canvas in a figurative style with impressionistic paint strokes. His work is based on direct observations, memories and elements from the fantasy world. His figures are often included in the geometric plane division as equivalent elements. Hartwig's work can be found, for example, in the Drents Museum and in large collections such as ING Group. In addition to oil paint, Hartwig also works with screen printing techniques.

The atmosphere with fragments of color shows his work, warm light, cold reflections and sometimes the presence of human figures. Peter Hartwig made large-scale ceiling and wall paintings, on both independent and commissioned projects.

== External ==
- http://www.peterhartwig.nl/ (Official website)
