= Annaram =

- Census Town
- Location in Telangana, India Annaram (India)
- Coordinates: 17.628808°N 78.375921°E
- Country: India
- State: Telangana
- District: Medak district

Area
  - Total: 7.82 km^{2} (3.02 sq mi)

Population (2011)
  - Total: 6,840
  - Density: 875/km^{2} (2,270/sq mi)

Languages
  - Official: Telugu English Urdu
- Time zone: UTC+5:30 (IST)
- PIN: 502313
- Area code: 08418-xxxxxx
- Vehicle registration: TG
- Sex ratio: 950 ♂/♀
- Website: telangana.gov.in

Annaram is a census town in Medak district of the Indian state of Telangana.

== Economy ==
Its economy mainly depends on primary sectors of agriculture, cattle. It has Schneider Electric manufacturing industry warehouses, cycle assembling units and a few small-scale industries.
