= Wilhelmstraße (Wiesbaden) =

Thoroughfare in Wiesbaden, Germany

Coordinates: 50°4′55″N 8°14′41″E

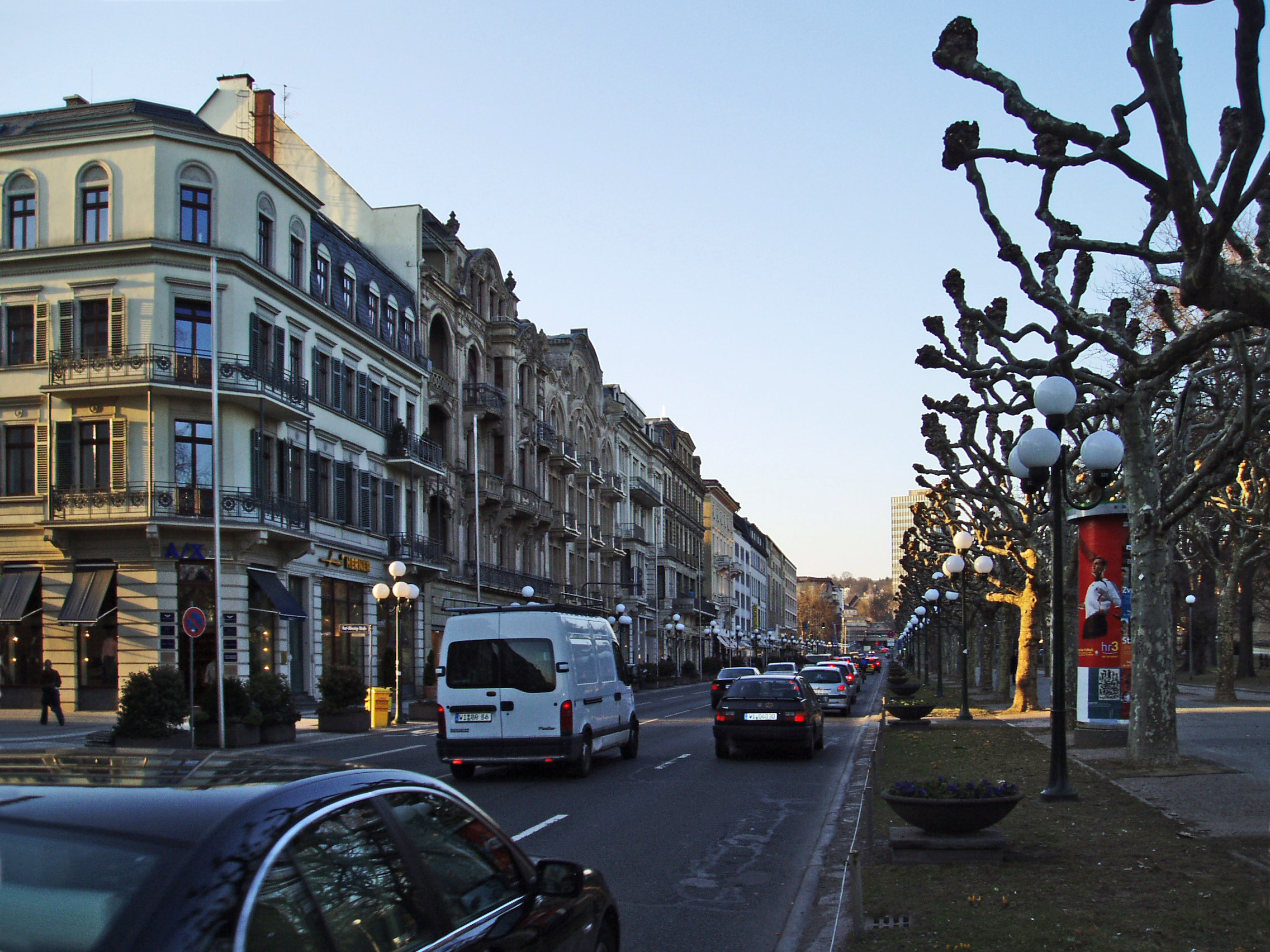
Wilhelmstraße towards its northern end

The Wilhelmstraße (German pronunciation: [ˈvɪlhɛlmˌʃtʁaːsə]) is an urban boulevard in Wiesbaden, state capital of Hesse, Germany. Nicknamed Rue by the locals, the Wilhelmstraße is one of Germany's busiest, upscale shopping streets.

The Wilhelmstraße is some 900 metres long and lies in the district of Nordost. It stretches from the Kureck (Spa) to Rheinstraße and Friedrich-Ebert-Allee on its southern end. At Kureck, the Wilhelmstraße reaches onto Warmer Damm, a park with a huge pond. Adjacent to Wilhelmstraße is the quarter Mitte, Wiesbaden's old quarter. The entire boulevard is some 30 metres (98 ft) wide and may be perceived as an urban esplanade. The Eastern side of Wilhelmstraße is entirely commercial, with upmarket stores and shopping arcades leading to and from the boulevard. The Western side is quieter, given that it predominantly has parks and some historical buildings.

== Places of interest nearby ==
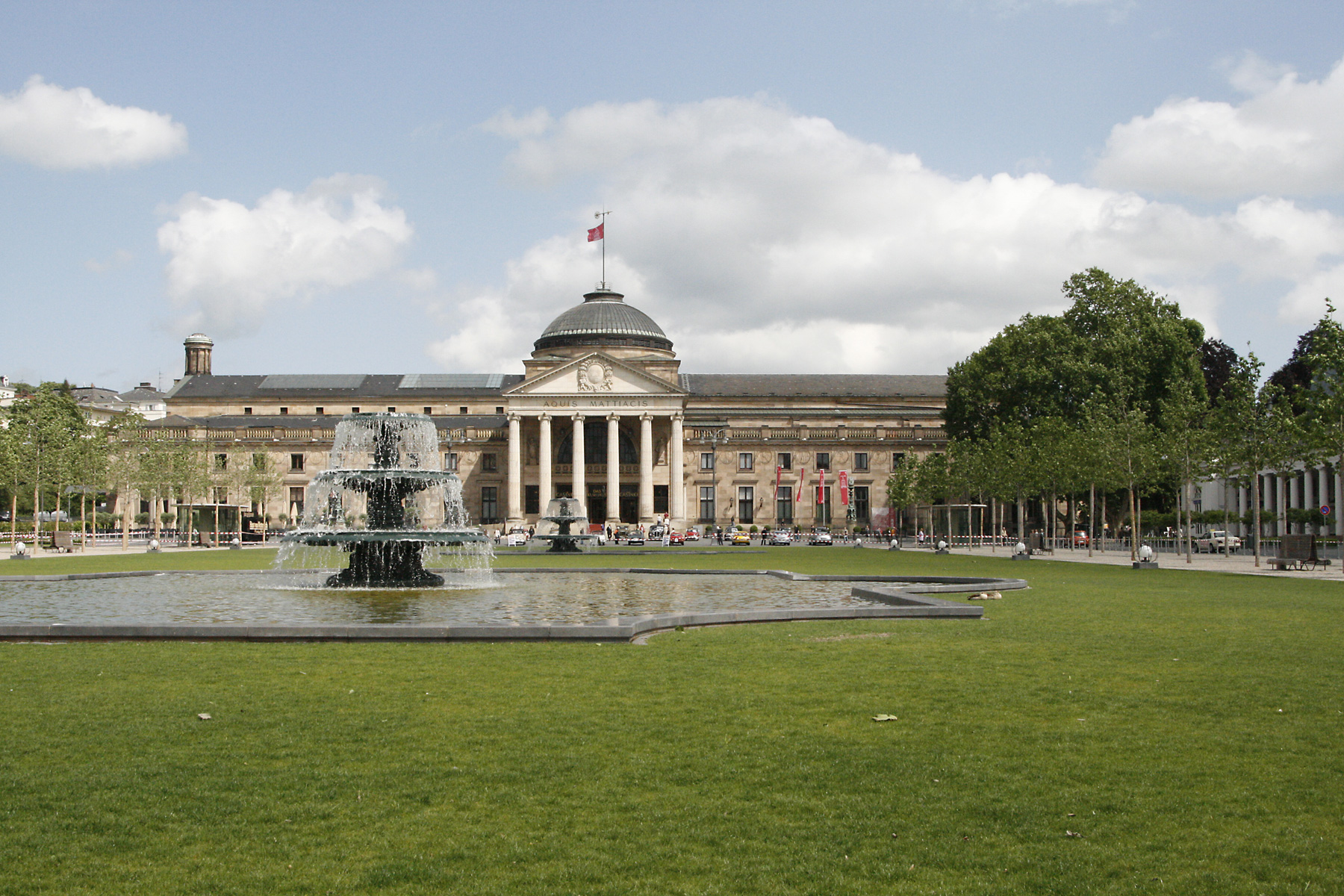
Bowling Green with Kurhaus

- Hotel Nassauer Hof, five star luxury hotel
- Kurhaus Wiesbaden with Casino and Kurpark
- Hessisches Staatstheater Wiesbaden
- Bowling Green
- Erbprinzenpalais
- Villa Clementine
- Museum Wiesbaden
- Rhein-Main-Hallen

== See also ==
- List of leading shopping streets and districts by city
- Pentagon (Wiesbaden)
