= Bowling Green, Wiesbaden =

Park in Wiesbaden, Hesse, Germany

Coordinates: 50°05′05″N 08°14′44″E

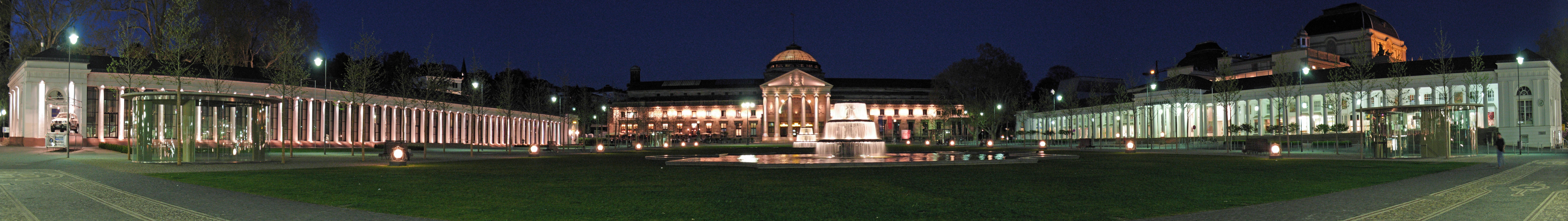
Bowling Green Panorama

The Bowling Green is a park in the Hessian state capital of Wiesbaden.

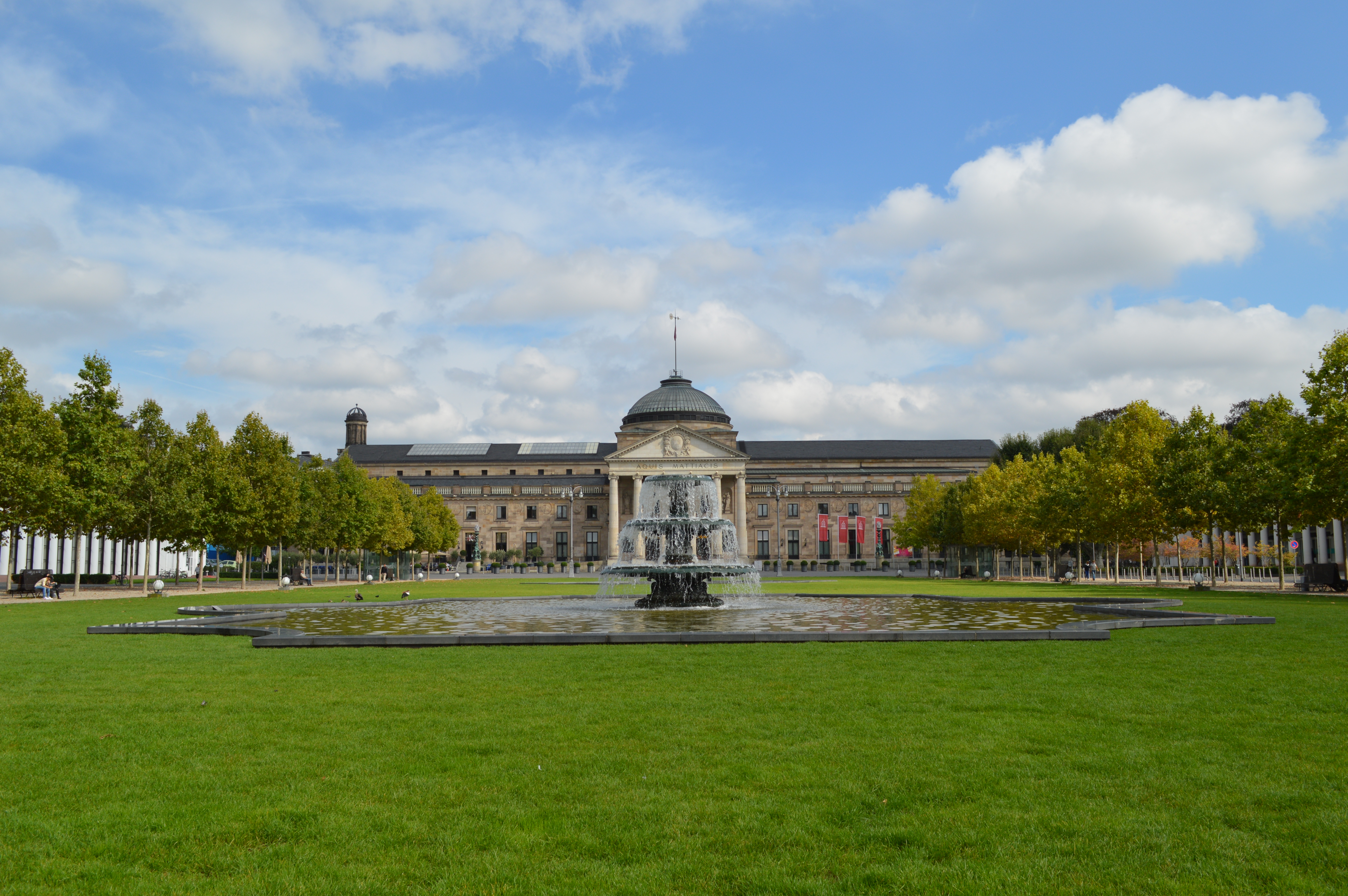
Wiesbaden's spielbank (casino) can be seen behind a fountain of the Bowling Green

The Bowling Green is a rectangular space with two pools and a three-shell fountain in the middle. On the east side of the Bowling Green, the park connects to the Kurhausplatz, a square in front of the historic Kurhaus of Wiesbaden. The Kurpark is located directly behind the Kurhaus, a historic casino in Wiesbaden. On the west side of Bowling Green, runs the Wilhelmstrasse. Across the street lies the Kaiser-Friedrich-Platz with the statue of Emperor Frederick III. The place is flanked by the luxury Hotel Nassauer Hof.

The Bowling Green is often used for open-air events for example held concerts by David Gilmour, Leonard Cohen, R.E.M., Sting, Nelly Furtado, Bryan Adams, Plácido Domingo, Lionel Richie, Eric Clapton, Elton John and Herbert Grönemeyer.

The Bowling Green is a place for special events. Every June, the Wilhelmstrassen festival takes place, which is one of the largest street parties in Germany. In addition, the largest New Year's Eve celebration in Wiesbaden takes place in the Kurpark.
