= Wiesbaden-Nordost =

Nordost
- Borough of Wiesbaden
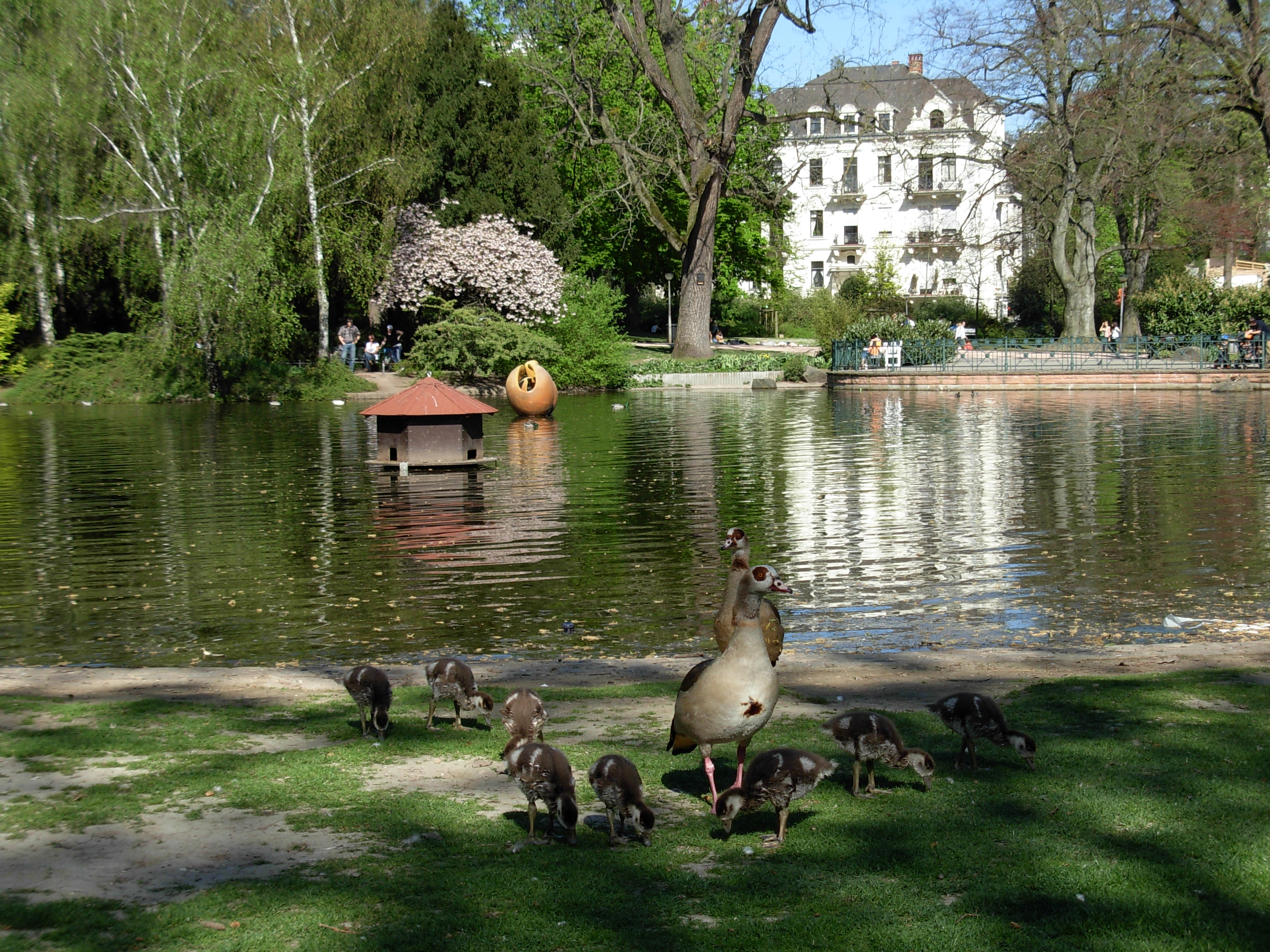
- Warmer Damm park in Nordost

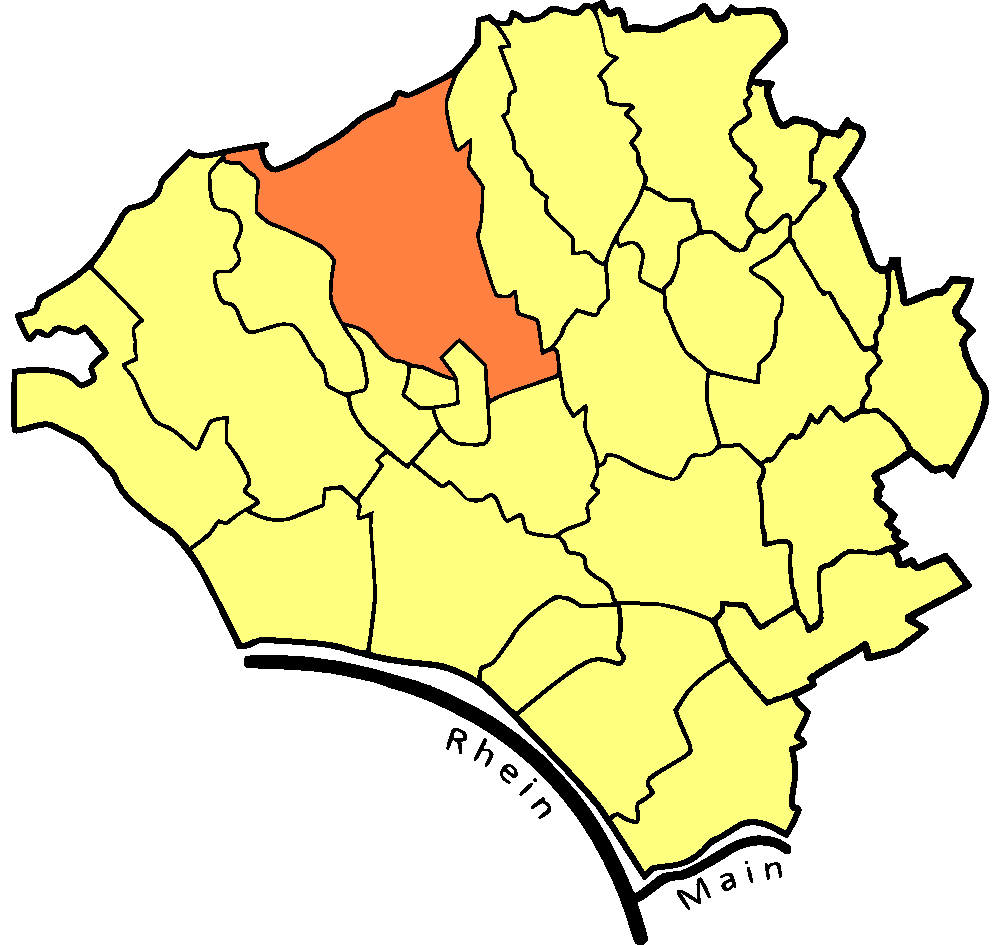
- Location of Nordost in Wiesbaden
- Interactive map of Nordost
- Location within Germany Location within Hesse
- Coordinates: 50°05′30″N 8°13′50″E
- Country: Germany
- State: Hesse
- District: Urban district
- City: Wiesbaden

Government
  - Mayor: Theo Baumstark (CDU)

Area
  - Total: 19.44 km^{2} (7.51 sq mi)

Population (2020-12-31)
  - Total: 22,834
  - Density: 1,175/km^{2} (3,042/sq mi)
- Time zone: UTC+01:00 (CET)
  - Summer (DST): UTC+02:00 (CEST)
- Postal codes: 65191, 65193, 65195
- Dialling codes: 0611

Nordost (north east) is a borough of the city of Wiesbaden, Hesse, Germany. With over 22,000 inhabitants, it is one of the most-populated of Wiesbaden's boroughs.

Despite its name, it is located in the north west of the city, and reaches from the city centre to the northern municipal border in the Taunus mountains. A great part of its area is covered with forests. Only about a quarter of the area is inhabited.

Due to its preferential location on the southern slope of the Taunus mountains, Nordost is known as a rather affluent borough with the highest housing prices in Wiesbaden. Nordost has the highest purchasing power per inhabitant of all boroughs, at about 29,000 Euro per inhabitant.

== Sources ==
- Derived from German Wikipedia
