= Warmer Damm =

Public park in Wiesbaden, Germany

Coordinates: 50°04′55″N 08°14′47″E

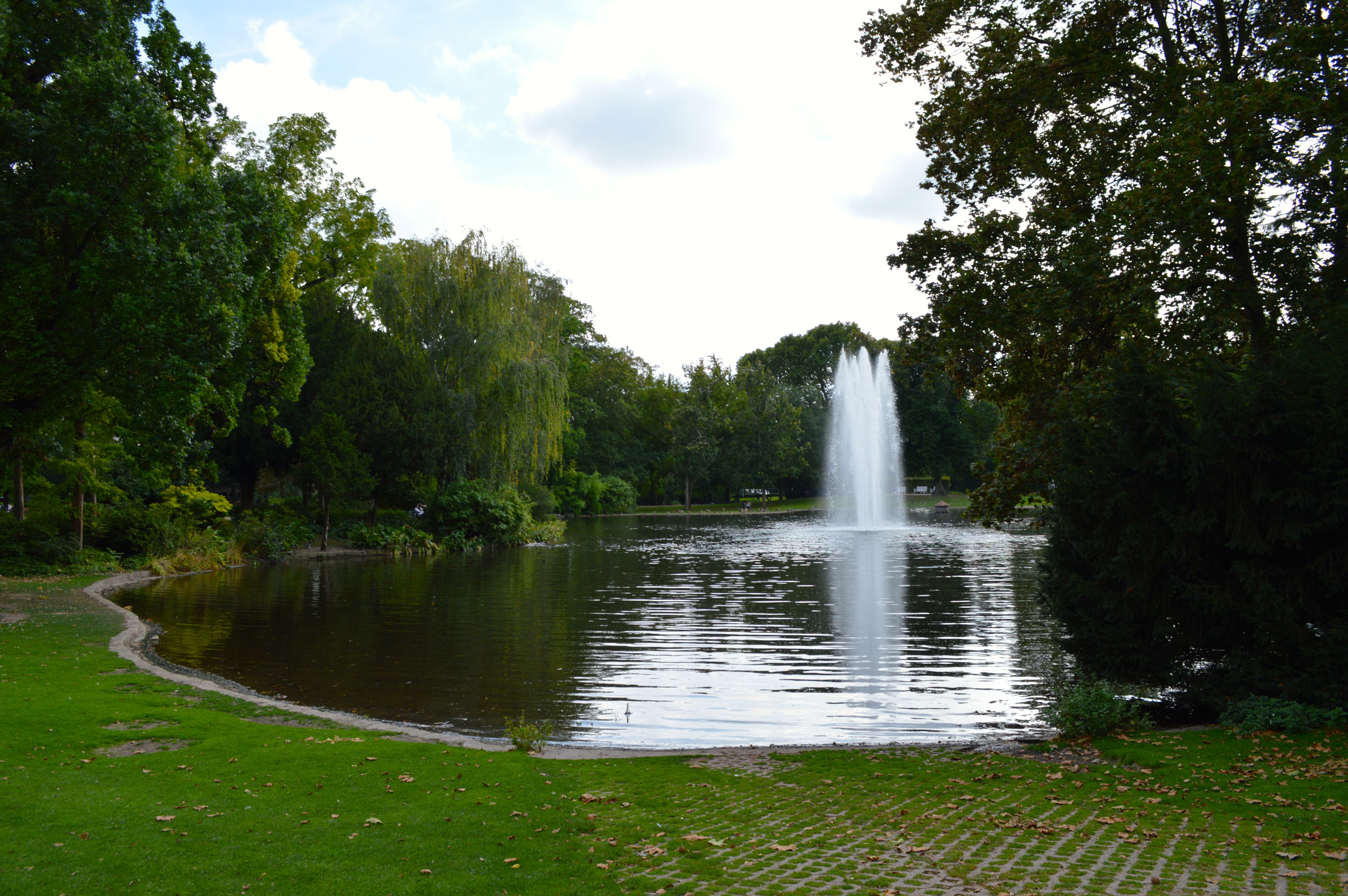
- A pond and fountain in the Warmer Damm
- Interactive map of Warmer Damm
- Location: Wiesbaden, Hesse, Germany
- Area: 47,000 m^{2} (510,000 sq ft)
- Created: 1861

The Warmer Damm is a public park in the centre of Wiesbaden, Germany, stretching from the Wilhelmstraße to the southern borders of the Kurpark and lying immediately in front of the Hessian State Theater. It was created between 1860 and 1861 as an English landscape park and includes a pond.

== Gallery ==
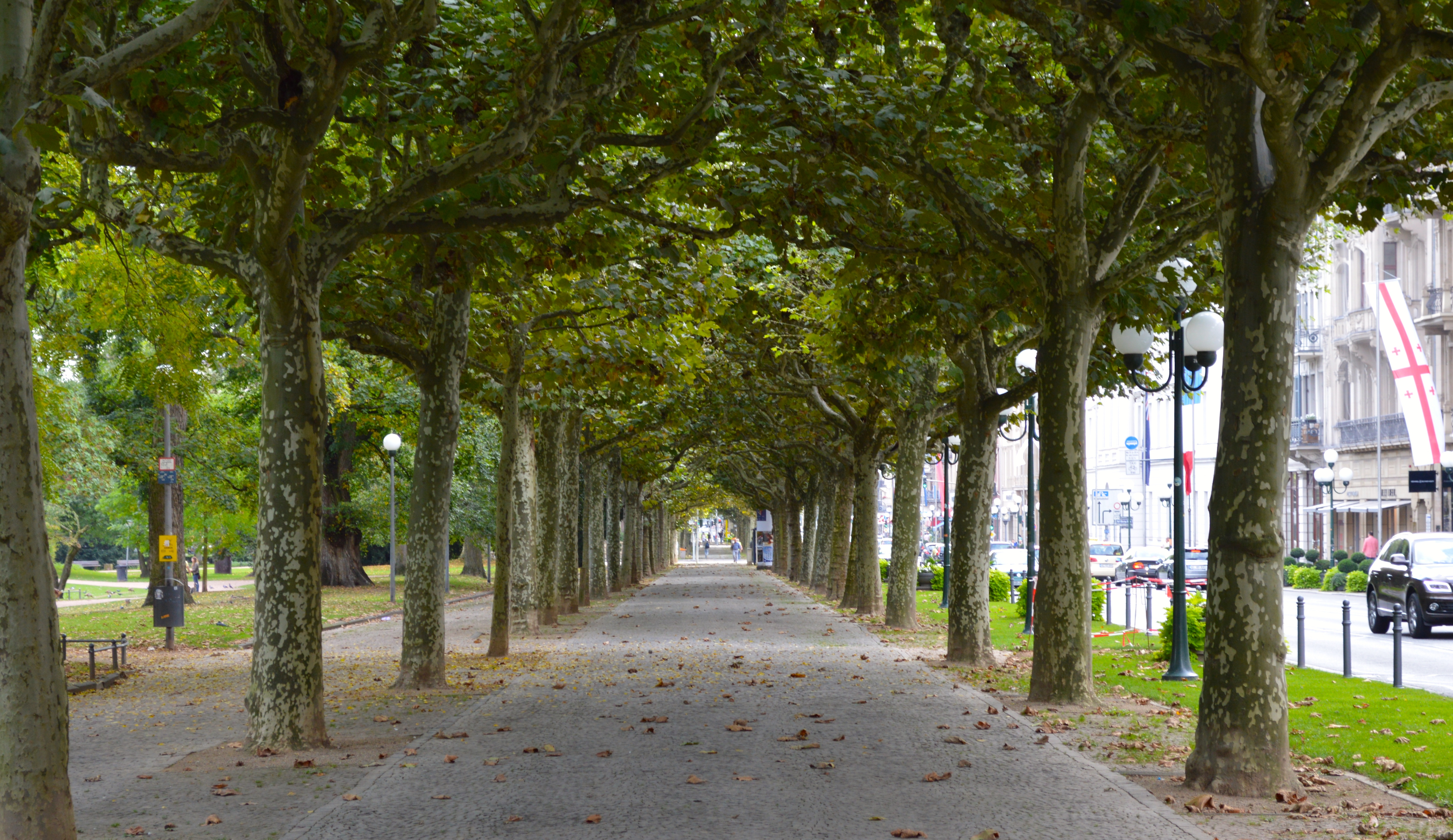
A treed promenade of the Warmer Damm, running adjacent to Wilhelmstraße

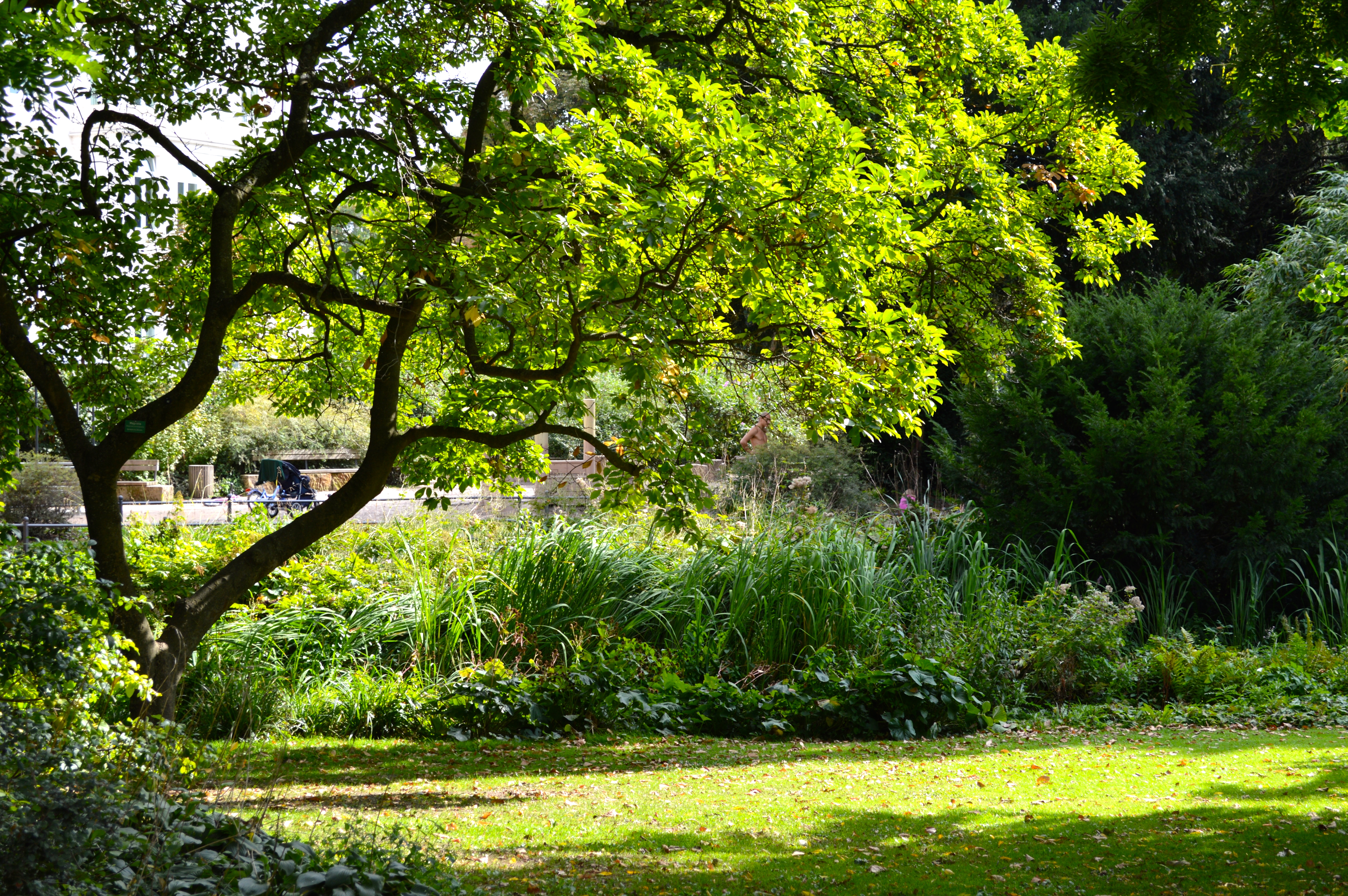
A garden of the Warmer Damm

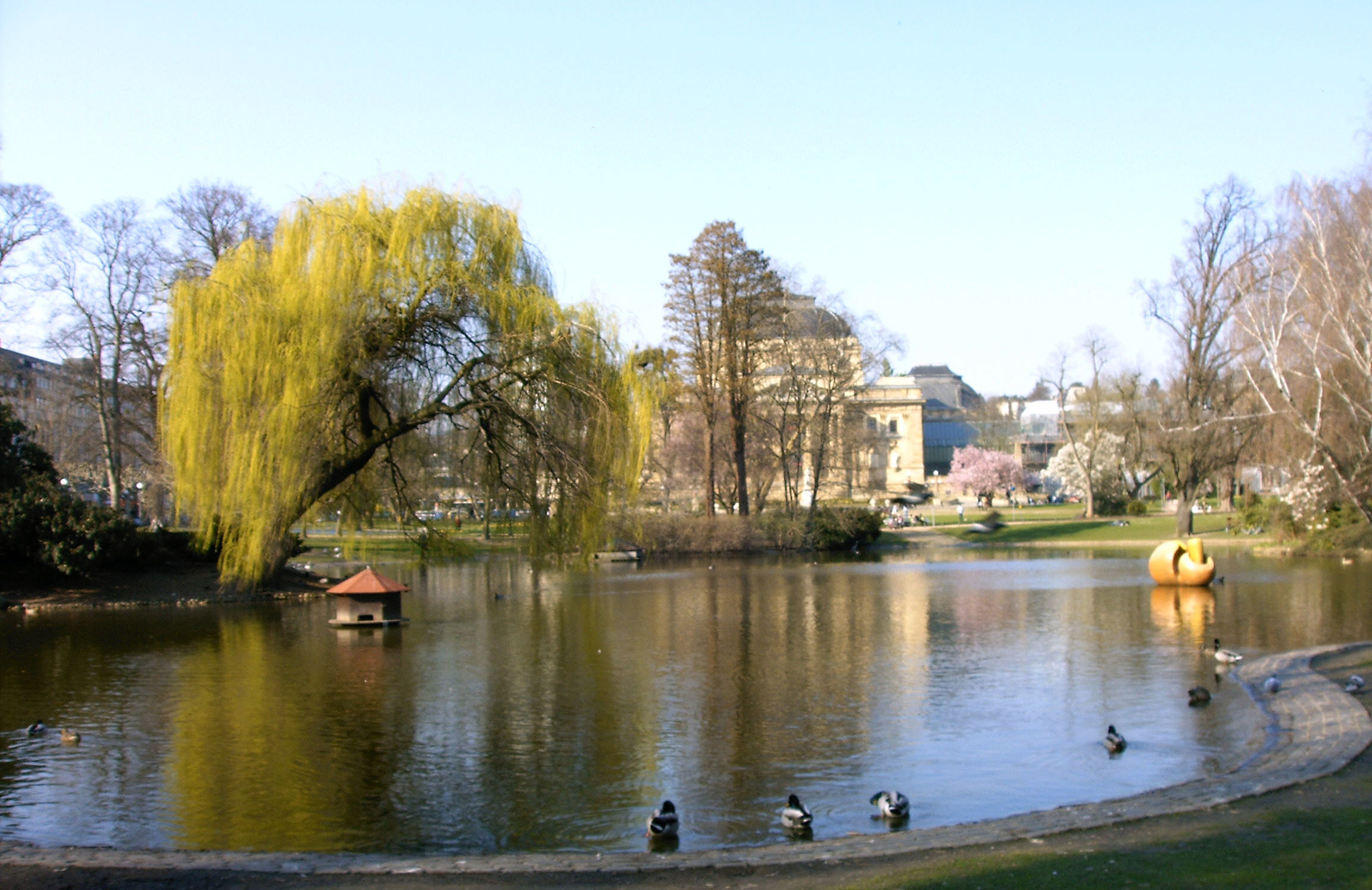
The big pond

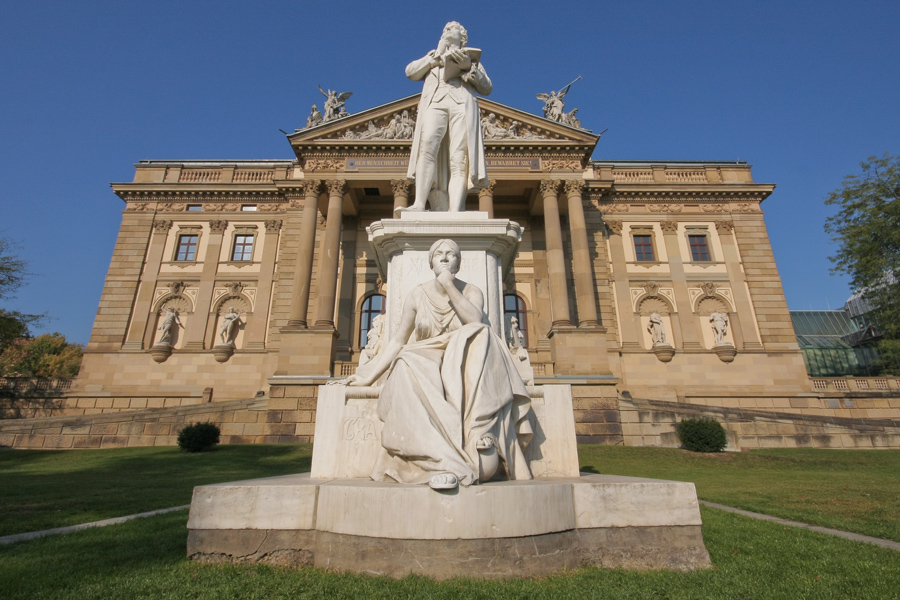
The Schiller monument and the state theater

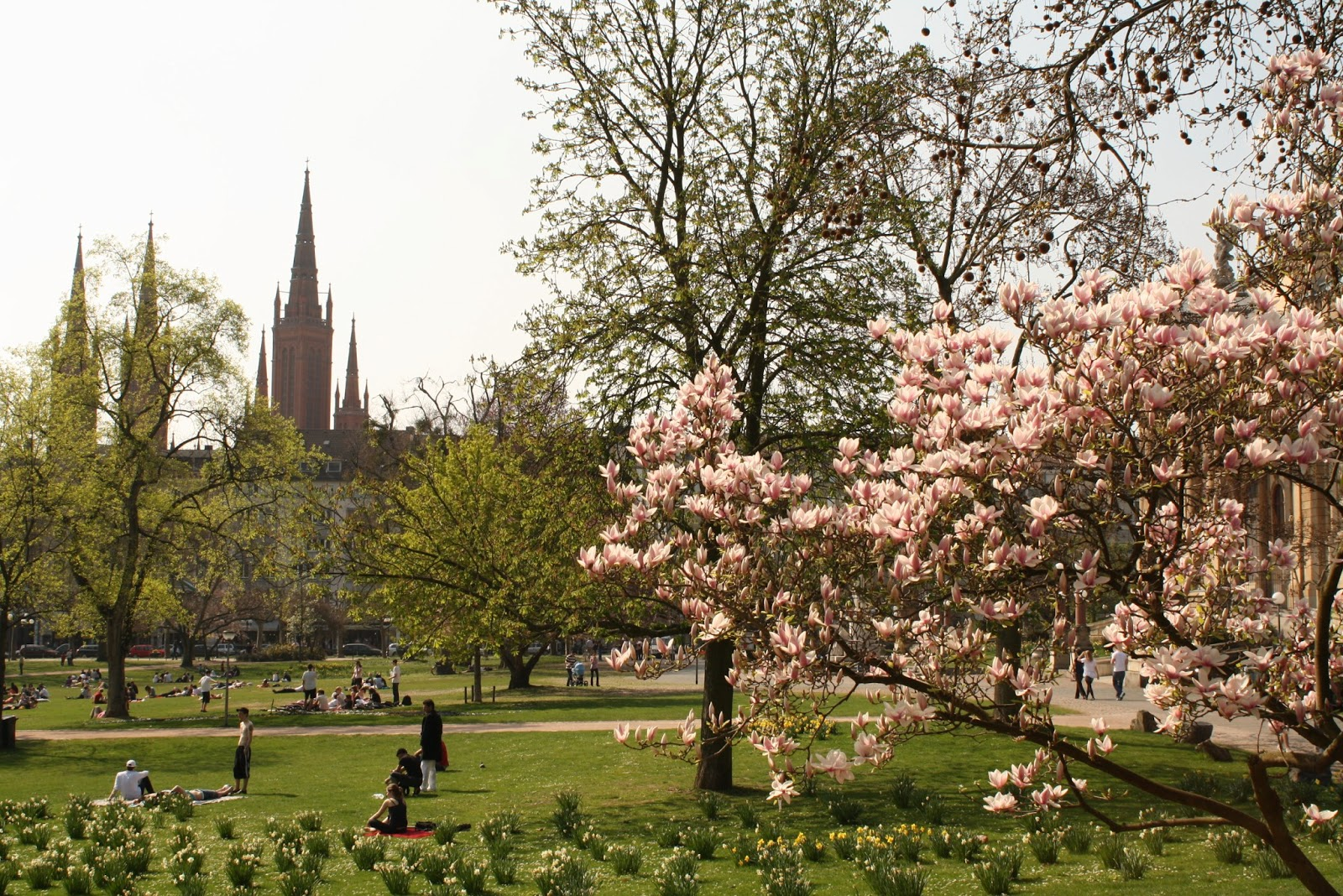
Marktkirche seen from the Warmer Damm
