= Christian Zais =

German architect and city planner

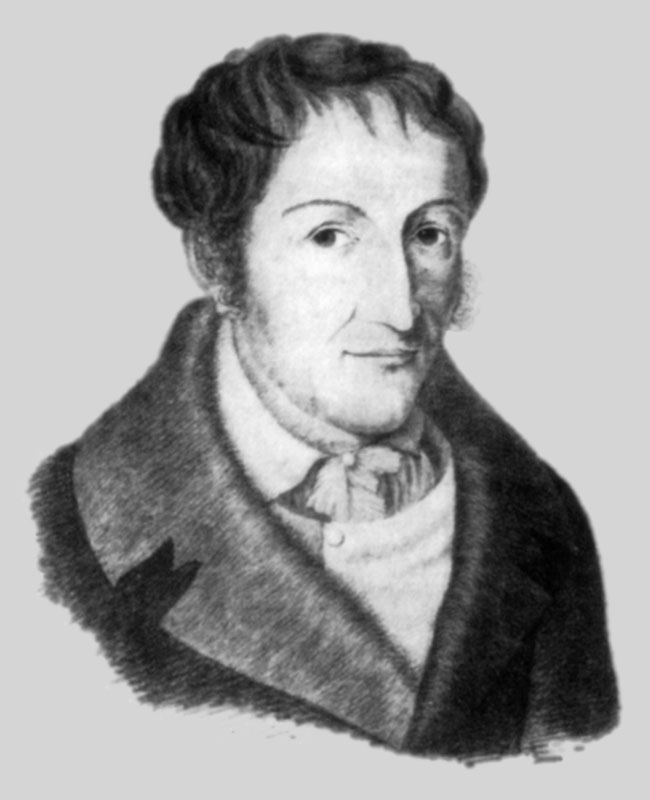
- Born: March 4, 1770; Cannstatt
- Died: April 26, 1820 (aged 50); Wiesbaden
- Occupation: Architect
- Buildings: Erbprinzenpalais at Wilhelmstrasse, Kurhaus, Wiesbaden

Christian Zais (4 March 1770 – 26 April 1820) was a German architect and city planner. Zai was born in Cannstatt, studied at the Karlsschule Stuttgart, and was taught by Karl August Friedrich von Duttenhofer and Johann Jakob Atzel. He designed several buildings in the spa city of Wiesbaden.

== Work ==
Christian Zais' work characterizes the inner city of Wiesbaden with his lasting urban design. Zais designed a number of important buildings in the spa town, including the construction (1808-1811) of the Old Kurhaus Wiesbaden, the Erbprinzenpalais at Wilhelmstrasse (used today as the Chamber of Commerce) in 1813, and the Four Seasons hotel which was destroyed during Allied bombings in 1945.

He promoted the use of cheaper materials at the time, including extensive use of rammed earth; some of these constructions remain to this day. 1818 saw Zais develop a city master plan for the "enlargement and beautification of the city"; the plan included surrounding the city's historic district with new streets in a pentagonal arrangement. Zais faced strong opposition from the city's inhabitants while implementing his ideas, which were backed by William, Duke of Nassau, operating from his Biebrich Palace residence. Given this opposition, Zais deliberately placed the Kurhaus outside the city bounds.

Using private funds, 1821 saw the culmination of the Four Seasons hotel and bath house construction, containing 140 rooms. This single building almost bankrupt the Zais family. Facing brisk opposition again from the local community, which sabotaged the spa's water sources, Zais died in Wiesbaden before the project's completion. Initially buried at Heidenmauer, in 1832 his remains were moved to the cemetery on Platter street. His grave was replaced by a plaque.

== Gallery ==
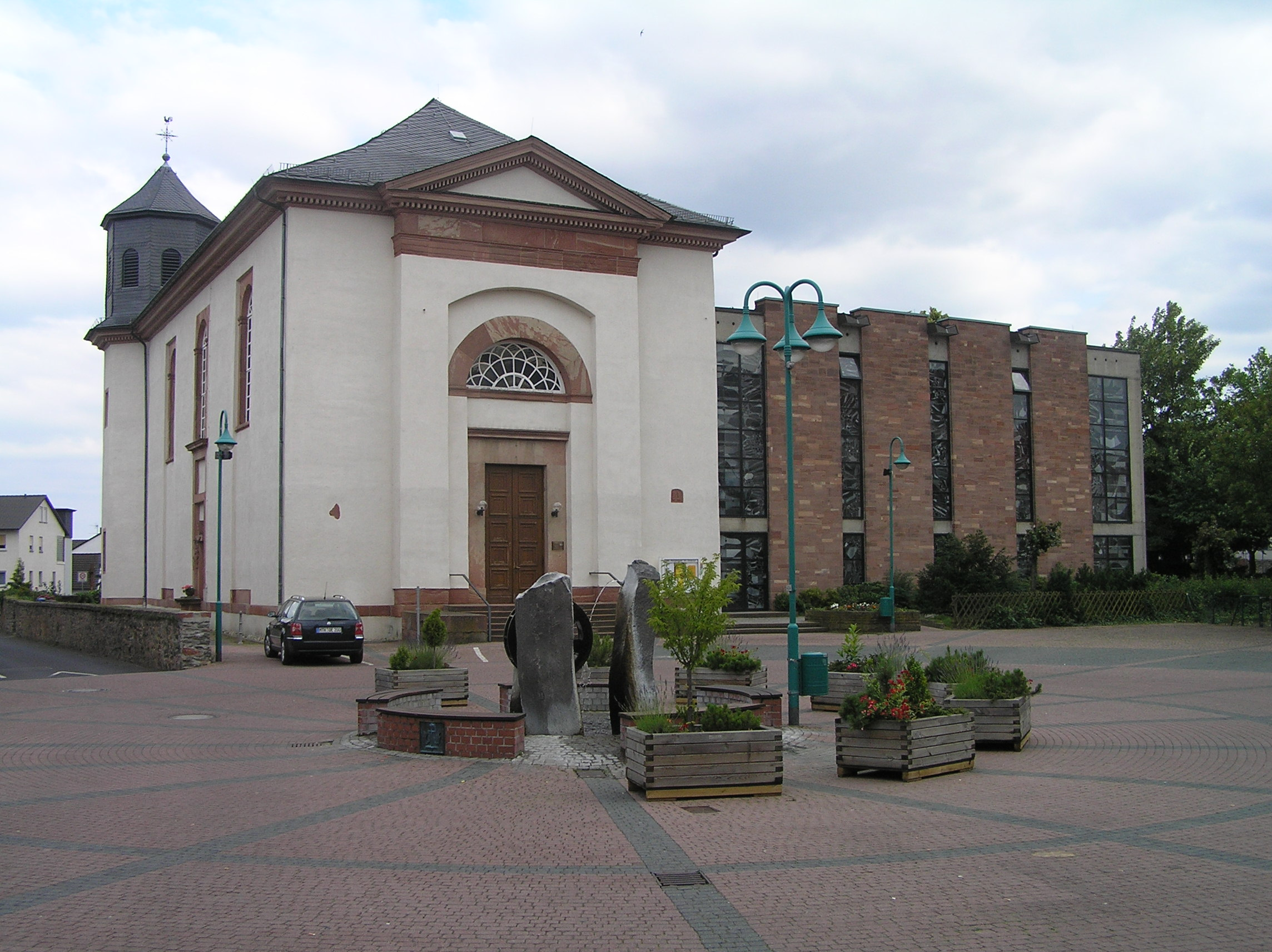
St. Dionysius church in Kelkheim-Münster

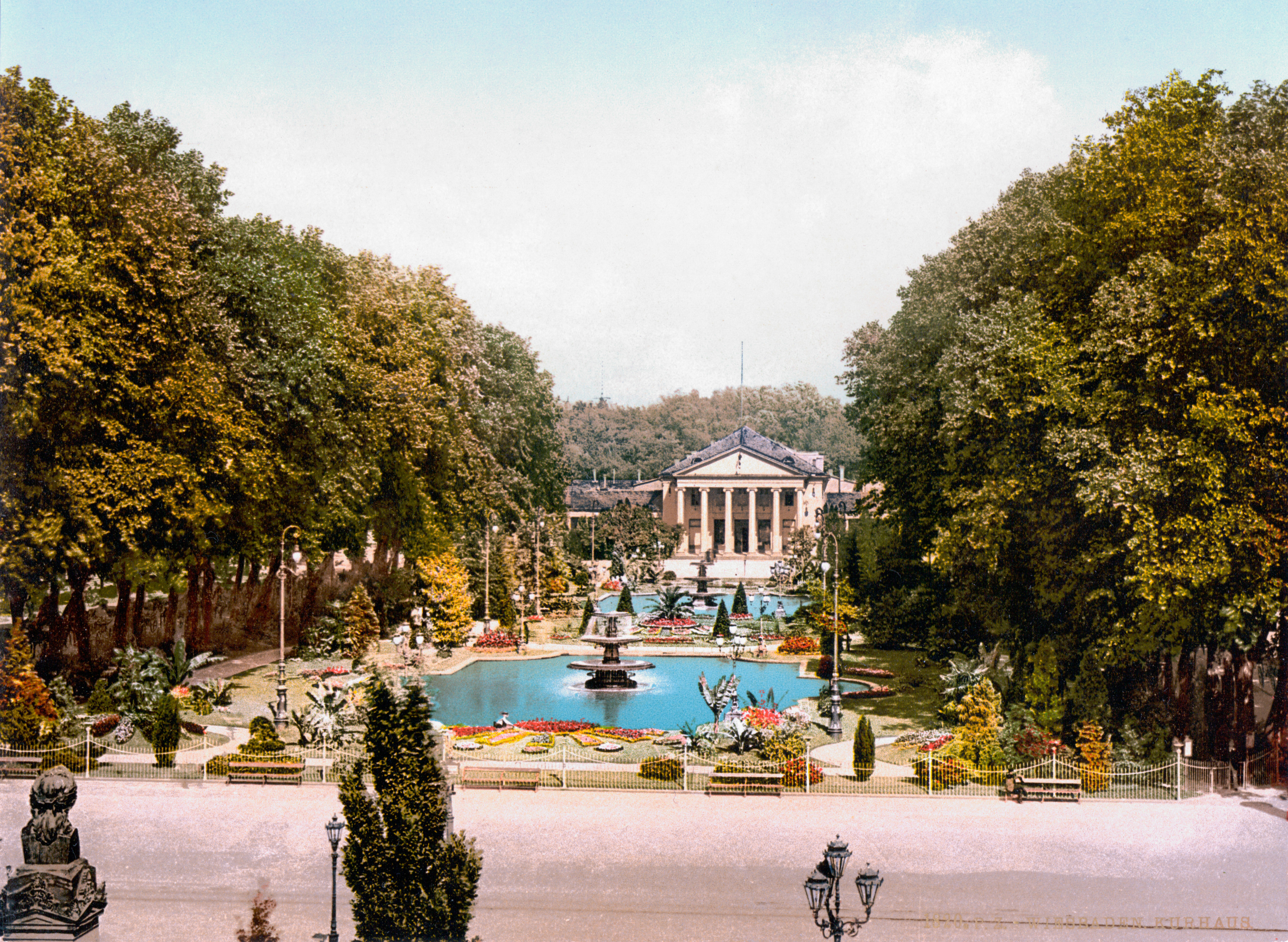
Kurhaus, 1820

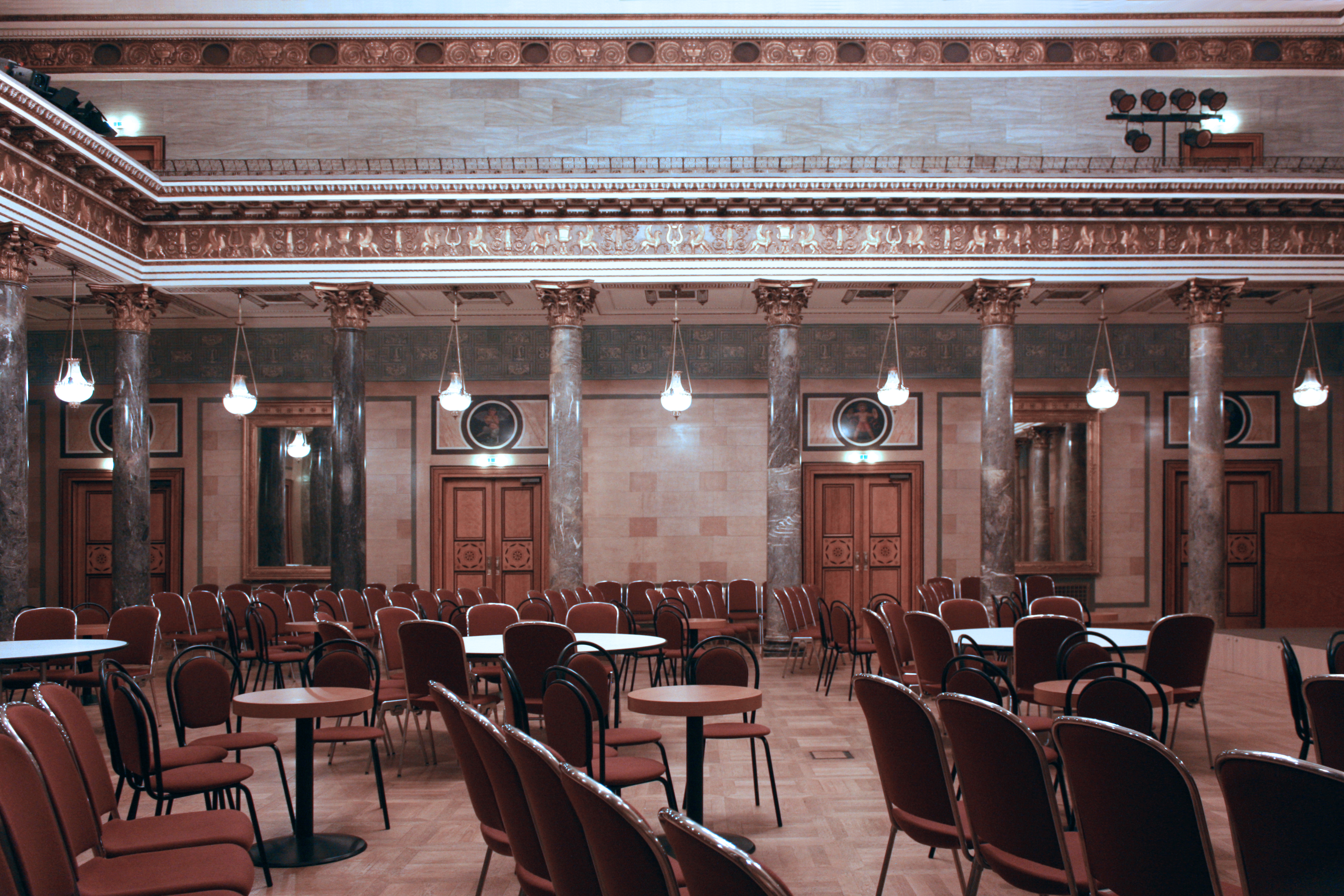
Christian Zeis room in Kurhaus Wiesbaden

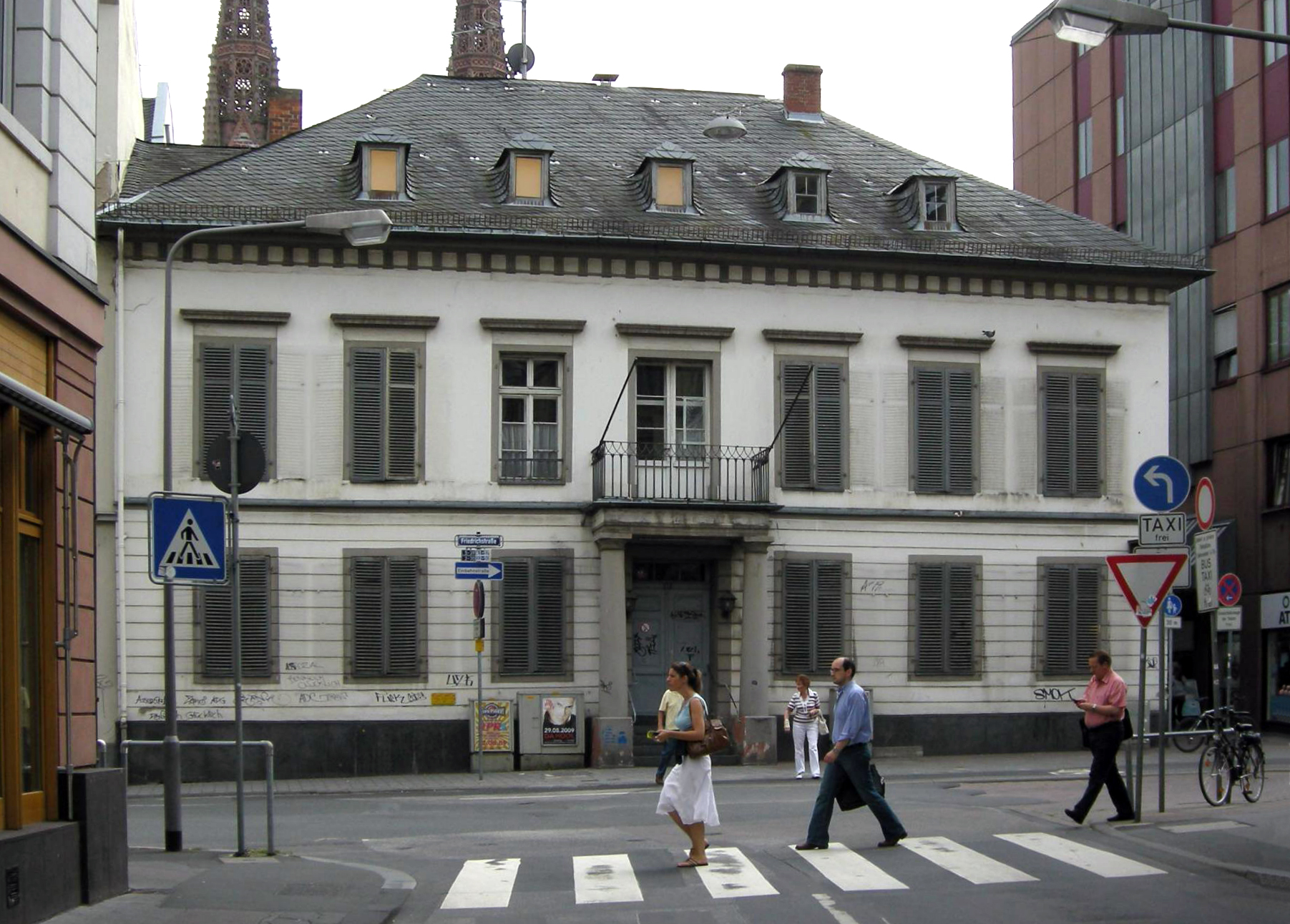
Schenksche Haus in Wiesbaden

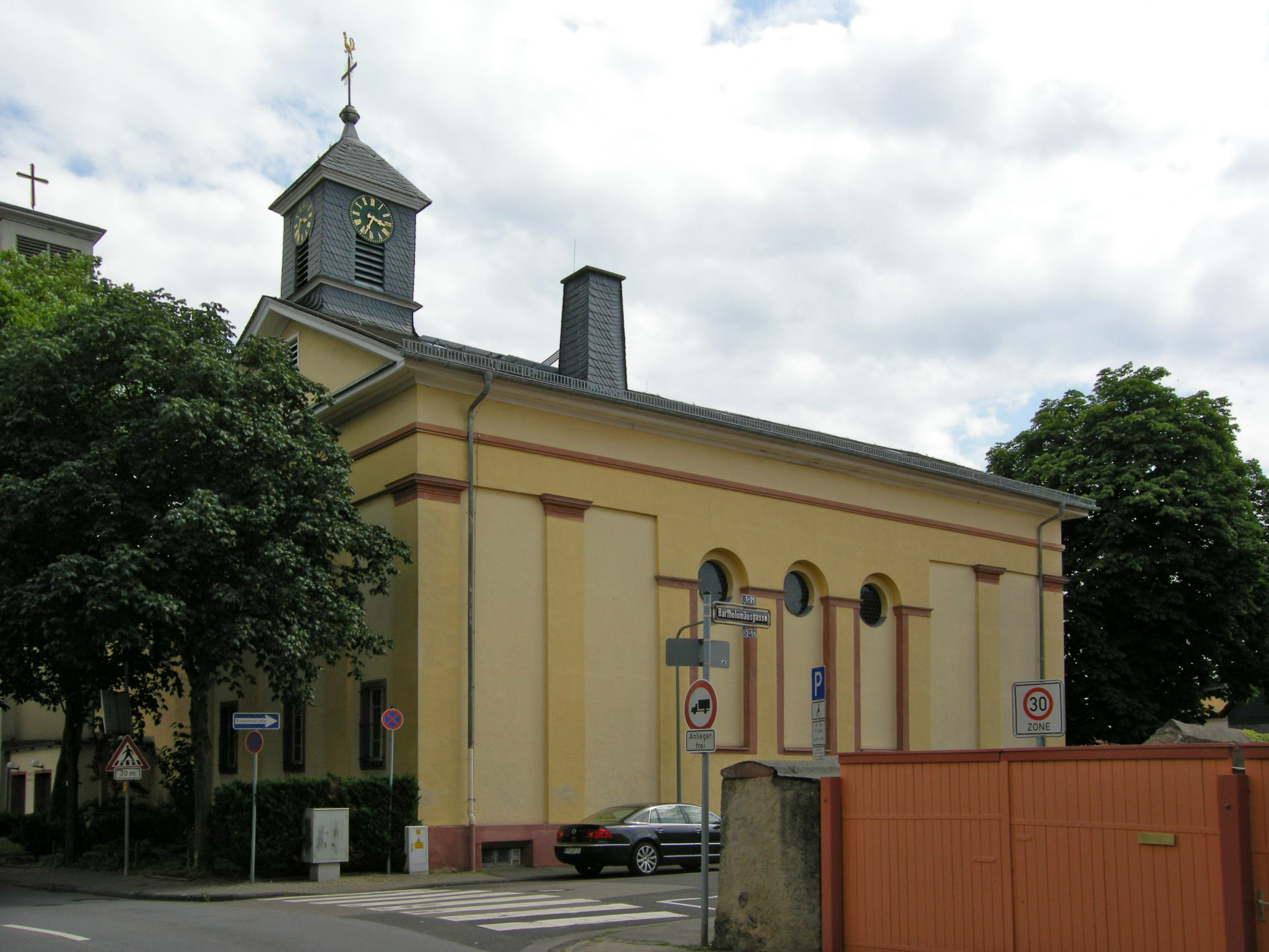
St. Bartholomäus Zeilsheim
