= Kurhaus, Wiesbaden =

Building in Wiesbaden

Kurhaus Wiesbaden
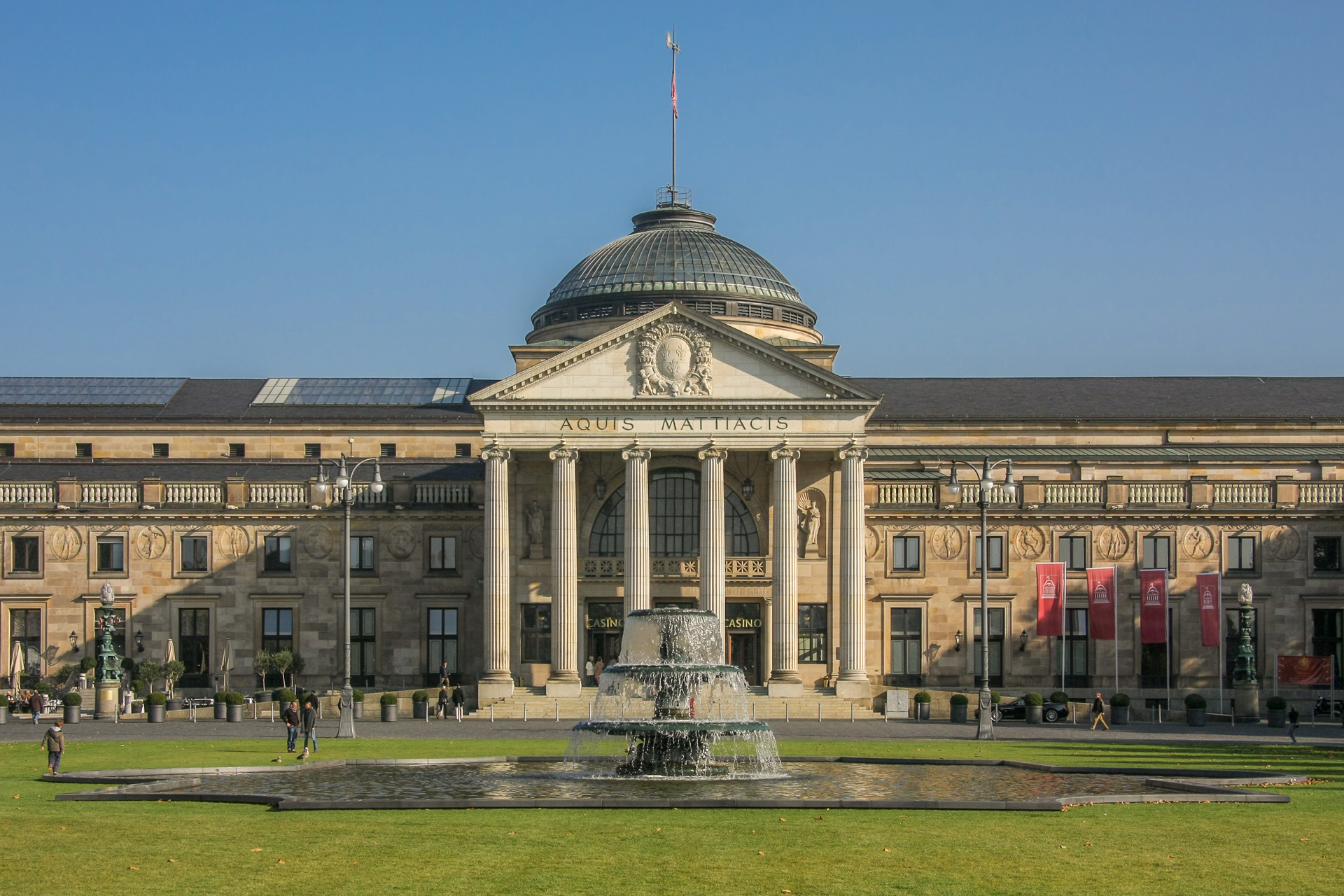
- Kurhaus (2012)
- Interactive map of the Kurhaus Wiesbaden area

General information
- Architectural style: Art Nouveau
- Location: Wiesbaden, Hesse, Kurhausplatz 1; 65189 Wiesbaden, Germany
- Coordinates: 50°5′5″N 8°14′51″E
- Inaugurated: 1907; 119 years ago
- Renovated: 1980s

Website
- tourismus.wiesbaden.de/entdecken/sehenswertes/kurhaus

The Kurhaus ("cure house", German pronunciation: [ˈkuːɐ̯haʊ̯s]) is the spa house in Wiesbaden, the capital of Hesse, Germany. It serves as the city's convention centre, and the social center of the spa town. In addition to a large and a smaller hall, it houses a restaurant and the Wiesbaden Casino, or Spielbank, which is notable for allowing the "highest roulette stakes in Germany" (as of 2005), and where Fyodor Dostoyevsky was said to have received the inspiration for his novel The Gambler.

== Location ==
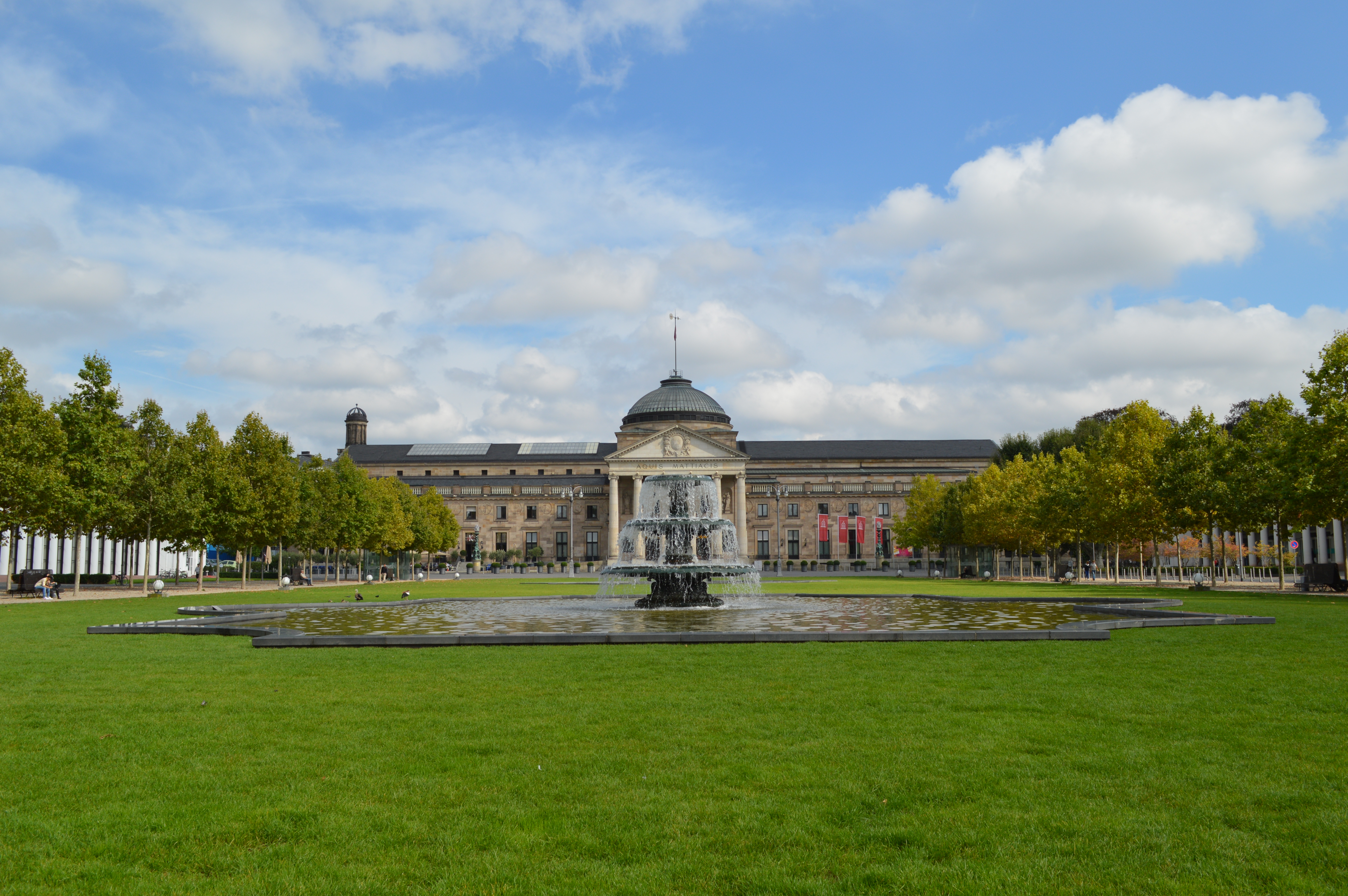
Wiesbaden's spielbank (casino) can be seen behind a fountain of the Bowling Green.

The Kurhaus Wiesbaden is in the centre of Wiesbaden, part of the Kureck (spa corner) at the end of the main street, Wilhelmstraße, with the town proper being situated on the other side of the Wilhelmstraße.

Its main entrance, on the west side, faces the so-called Bowling Green, a grass-covered square with two fountains, so named by British spa guests. On the south side of the green is the Hessisches Staatstheater with the Theater colonnade and on the north the Kurhaus colonnade or fountain hall, with a length of 129 metres (423 ft), it is the longest columned hall in Europe. It houses the slot machines for the casino. In 2004–06, an underground parking garage was constructed under the square and the aging plane trees that had formerly stood along both sides were replaced by young trees of the same species. Behind the Kurhaus, the landscaped Kurpark extends eastward, with a band shell and a fountain pond. The park is cited as the most scenic in the city.

== History ==
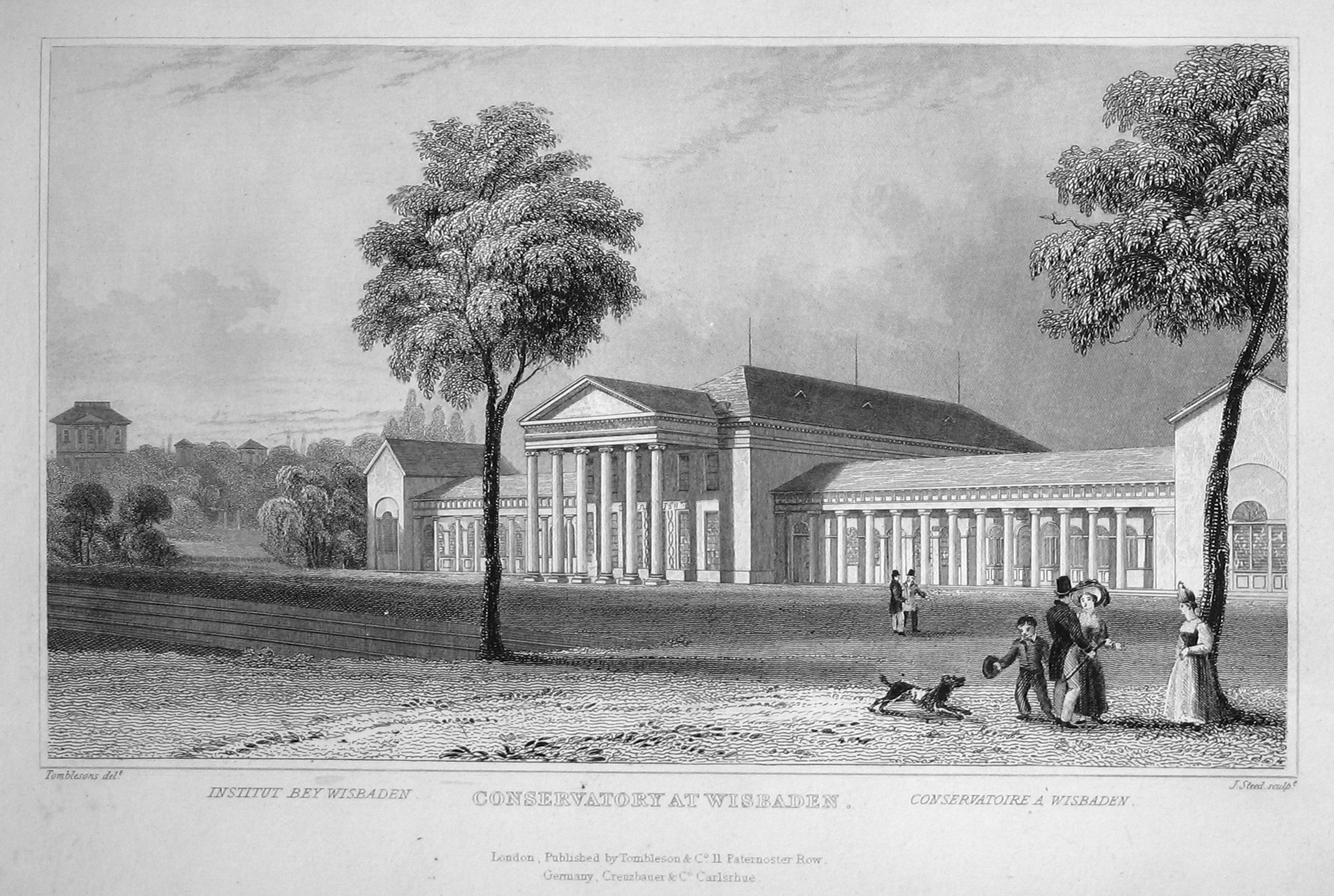
The old Kurhaus, steel engraving by William Tombleson (1840)

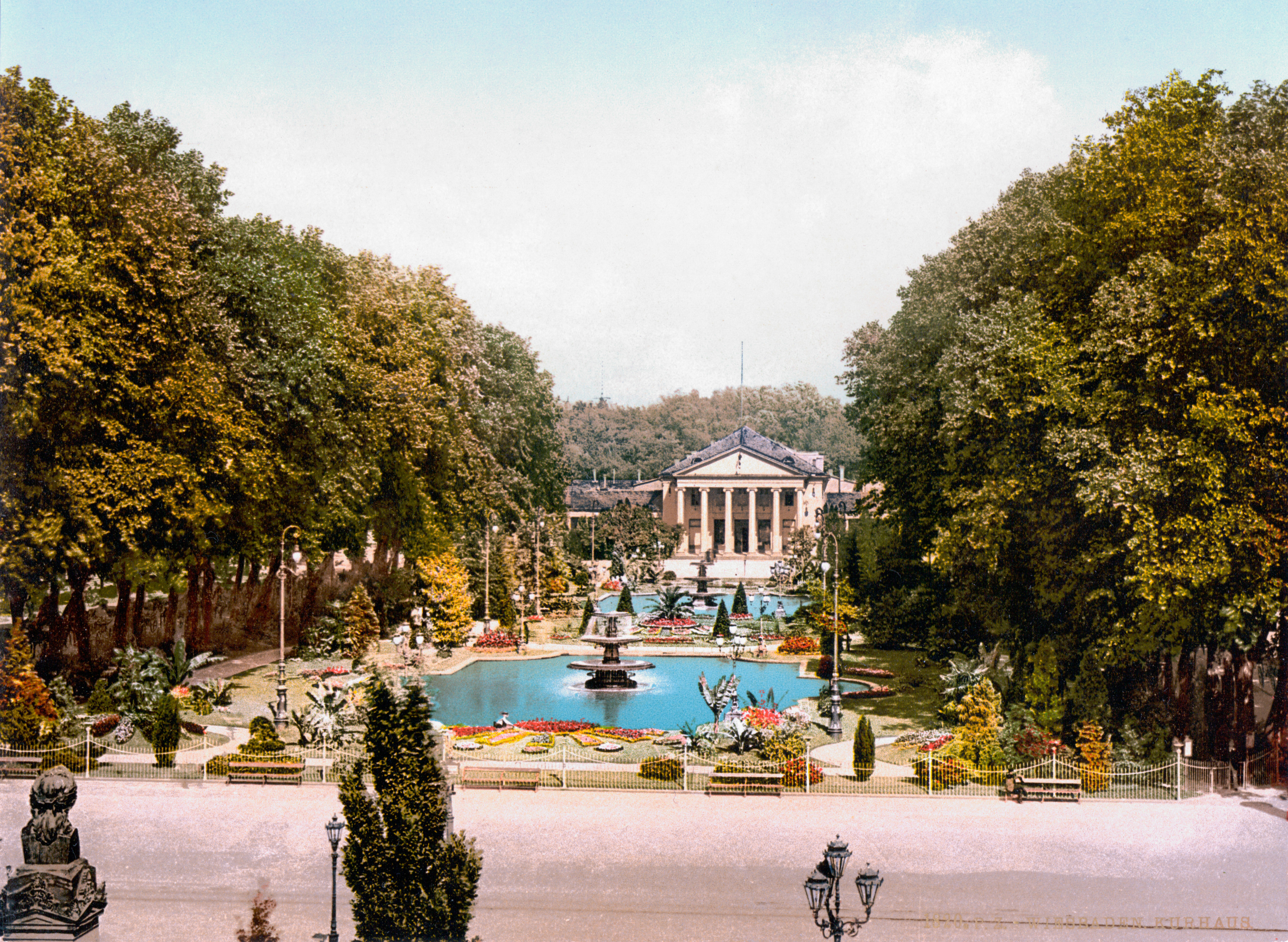
The old Kurhaus, 1900

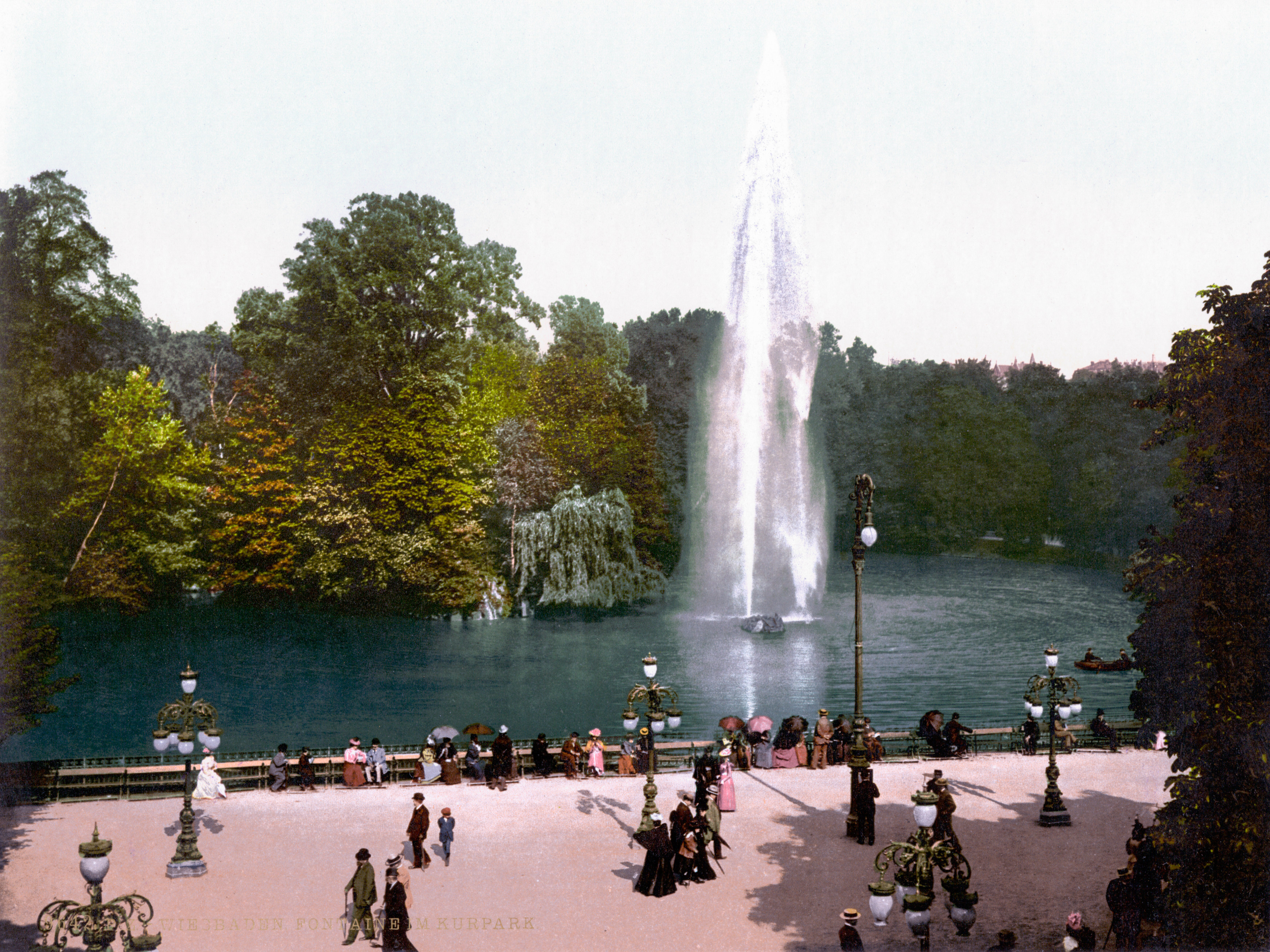
Kurpark, 1900

Wiesbaden has a long history as a spa town. The Romans already knew of the thermal springs of Wiesbaden. The name of the city is derived from Wisibada, the bathing place in the meadows. In 1810, the first spa house was built by Christian Zais. This was a beautiful but relatively modest building with a columned portico, including Doric and Ionic features, in classical style. Johann Wolfgang von Goethe praised the building on one of his many visits. During the 19th century, the benefits of the spa attracted the upper classes. The number of spa visitors, 20,000 in 1840, had increased tenfold by 1910.

A larger, more modern and more impressive spa house was thus required. In 1905–07, the old spa building was demolished, and in its place a new building, designed by architect Friedrich von Thiersch, was erected at a cost of six million gold marks. At the opening ceremony, Kaiser Wilhelm II, who visited the spa every year in May and had facilitated the rebuilding, called it "the most beautiful spa building in the world". The two concert halls in the building are named after the builders, the larger hall Friedrich von Thiersch Hall, and the smaller one Christian Zais Hall. Since 1949, the main portion of the Wiesbaden Casino has also been located in the building, in the former wine hall. During the 1980s, the Kurhaus underwent an extensive renovation, and was equipped with modern conference technology.

== Architecture and fittings ==
The Kurhaus Wiesbaden is constructed in neo-classical style with Art Nouveau elements; the facade is of Belle Époque style. Other exterior features are the Corinthian columns and the mythical griffins frieze. On the building's portal the words Aquis Mattiacis ("the waters of the Mattiaci") are inscribed, a tribute to the Germanic tribe that once inhabited the area.

The building is divided into two equal-sized wings. In the south wing is the large central pillar-lined concert hall (Friedrich von Thiersch Hall), with a parquet floor and balcony. The concert and event hall has 1,350 seats and measures 40 × 18 × 17 m. At the front end of the south wing is the "Muschelsaal" (Shell Hall). Originally the South Reading Room, it was decorated with frescoes by the Art Nouveau painter Fritz Erler and by Alexander von Salzmann, and with pebbles and shells symbolizing water and earth. A number of smaller function rooms, named after Carl Schuricht, Carl von Ibell, Fyodor Dostoyevsky, Ferdinand Hey'l and the emperor, offer a variety of spaces for events. At the other end, facing the park, the south wing ends in a winter garden. The north wing houses the smaller ballroom (Christian Zais Hall), a restaurant, and the main portion of the Wiesbaden Casino, which offers roulette, blackjack, and poker. Stucco decoration on the ceilings of the concert hall and reading room are by Arthur Storch.

Between the north and south wings, the foyer, with the main entrance on the west side and the park entrance opposite, is topped by a dome 21 m high. In front of each of the four piers supporting the dome are larger-than-life-size copies of Greek statues of deities, surmounted by mosaic medallions with colourful depictions of scenes featuring Roman deities.

In 1954, an organ was built by the Steinmeyer company of Oettingen, Bavaria. It replaced the 1907 Sauer organ that had been destroyed in World War II. The organ has 48 registers and 3,000 pipes. From 1987 to 2004 the organist of the Marktkirche, Hans Uwe Hielscher, also served as the spa organist; he was succeeded in 2004 by Thomas J. Frank.

== Events ==
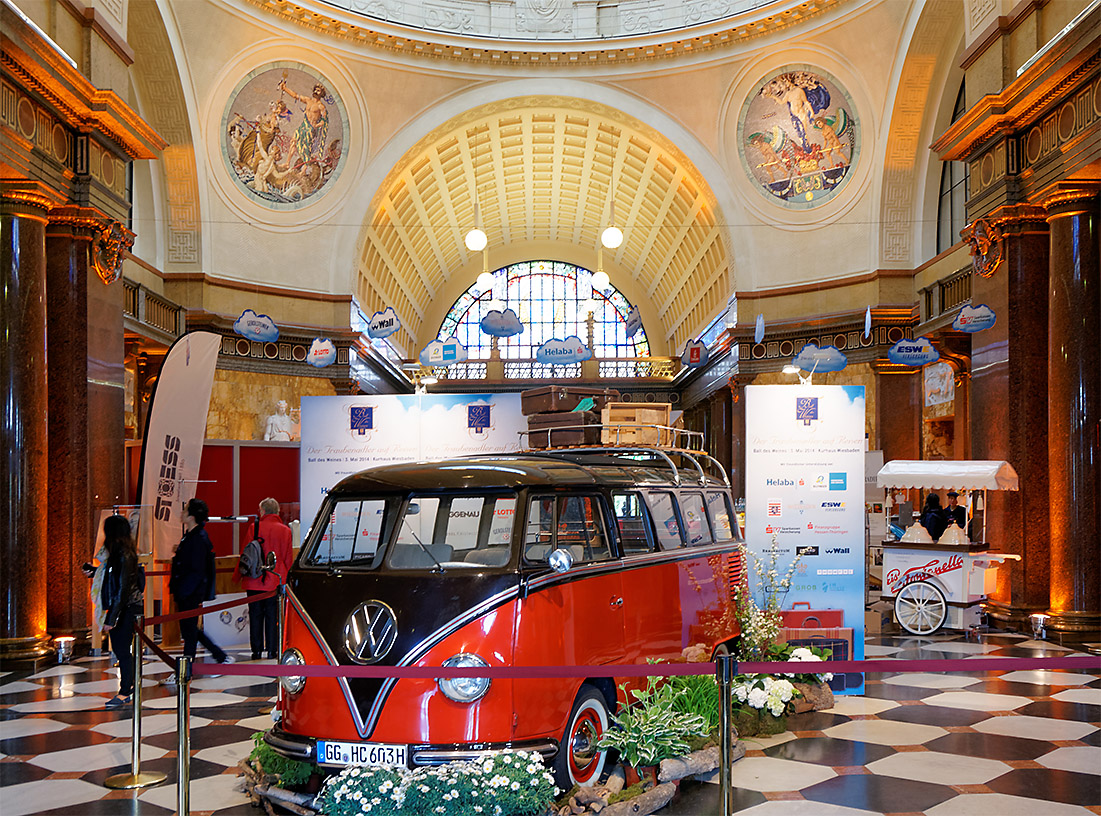
Ball des Weines 2014 (Wine Ball) - Scenic design Foyer

The spa hall has hosted many important national and international events such as concerts, balls and conferences. In the early 20th century, masked balls were held during the carnival season. Several companies based in Wiesbaden hold their annual general meetings there. The Kurhaus has also been used for filming TV series and movies. Sting performed in the Kurpark behind the building in 2004. It has a venue of the Rheingau Musik Festival from 2007. The Kurhaus also hosts graduation for students of Wiesbaden High School.

== Gallery ==
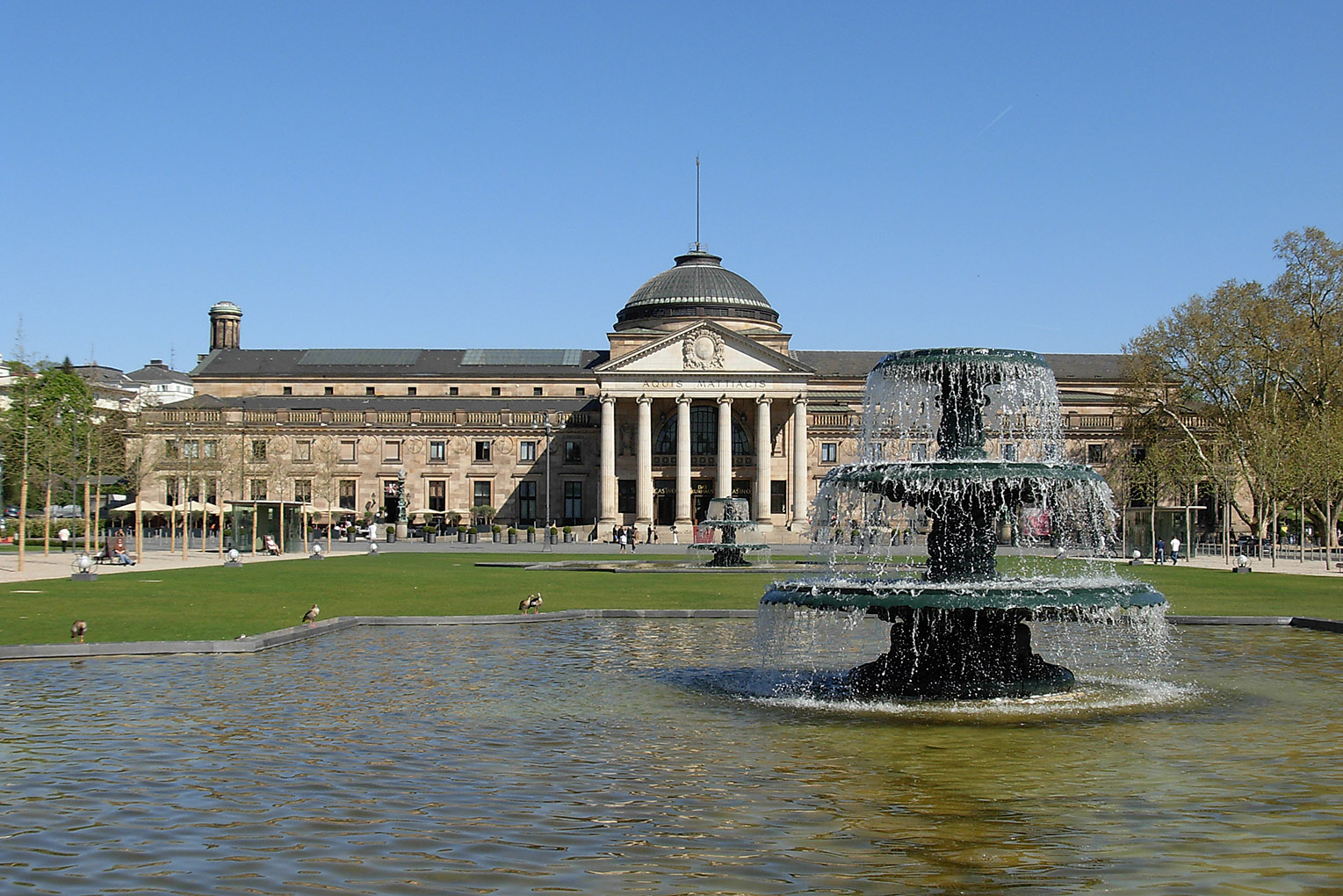
Kurhaus and Bowling Green

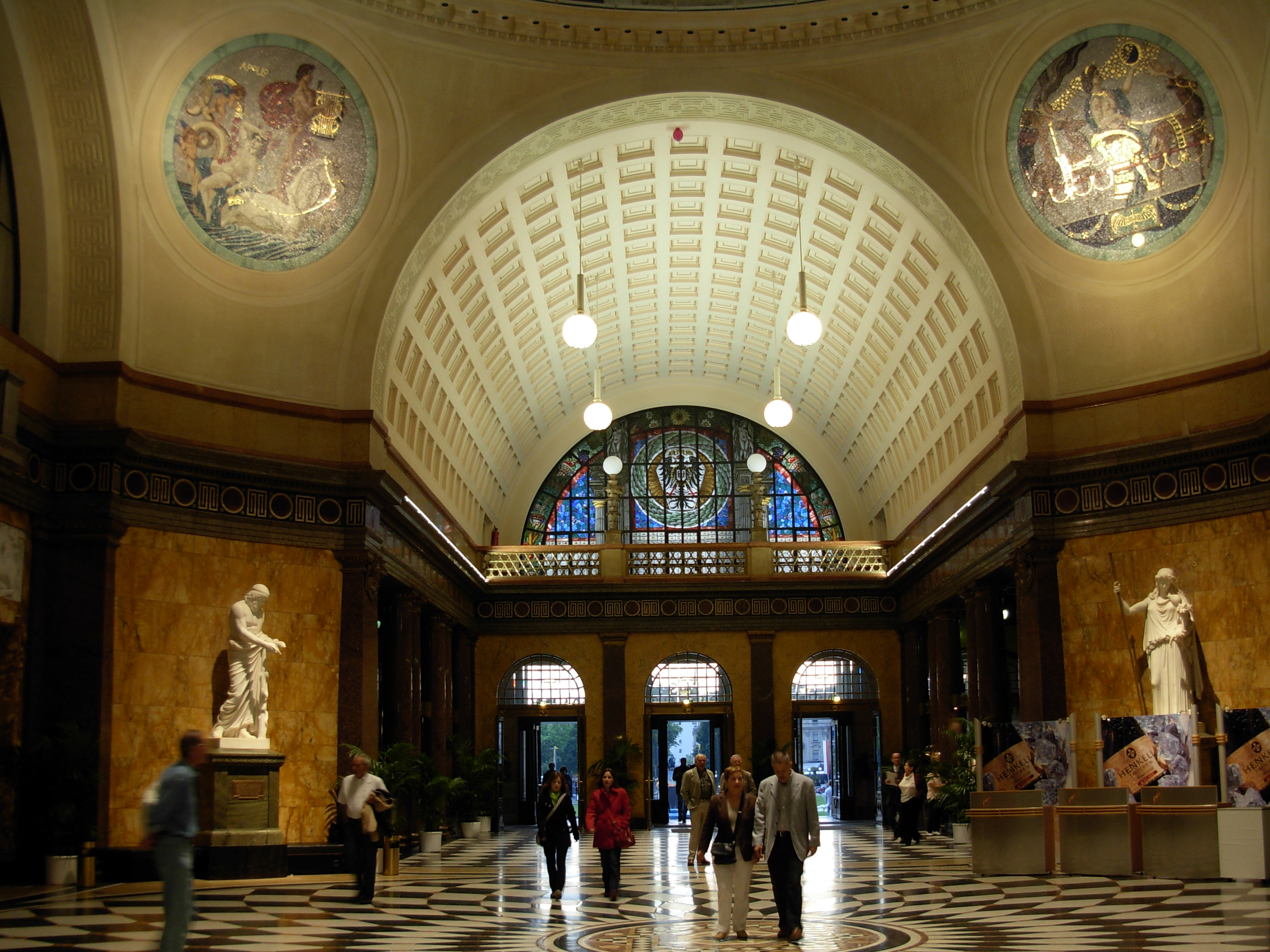
Kurhaus foyer

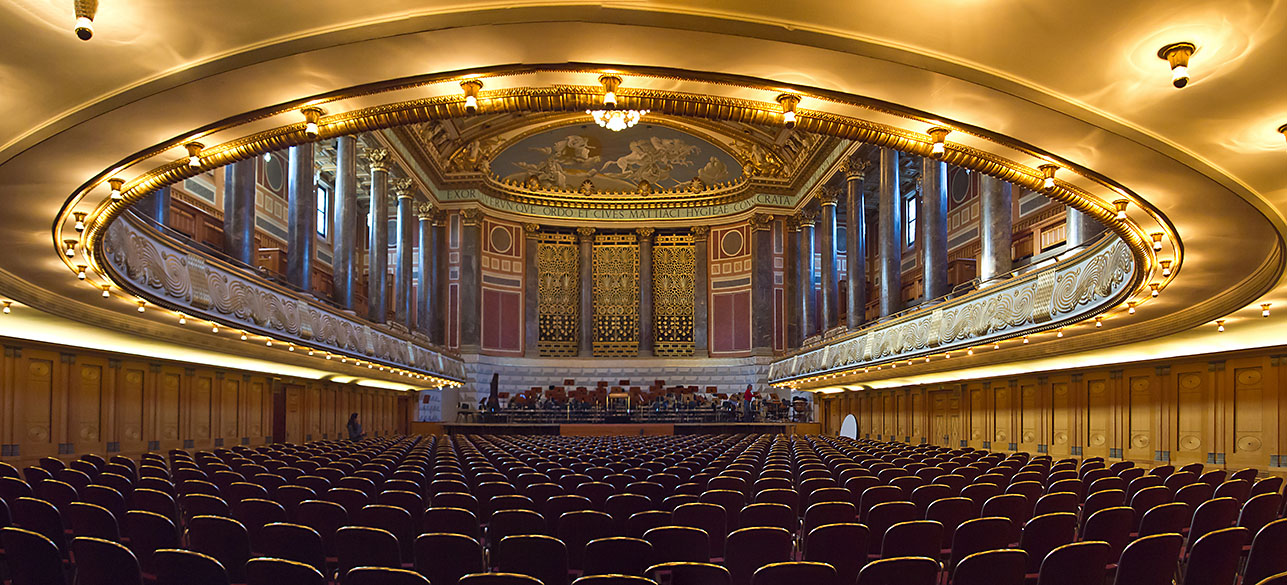
Friedrich von Thiersch Hall, view from Foyer to Podium

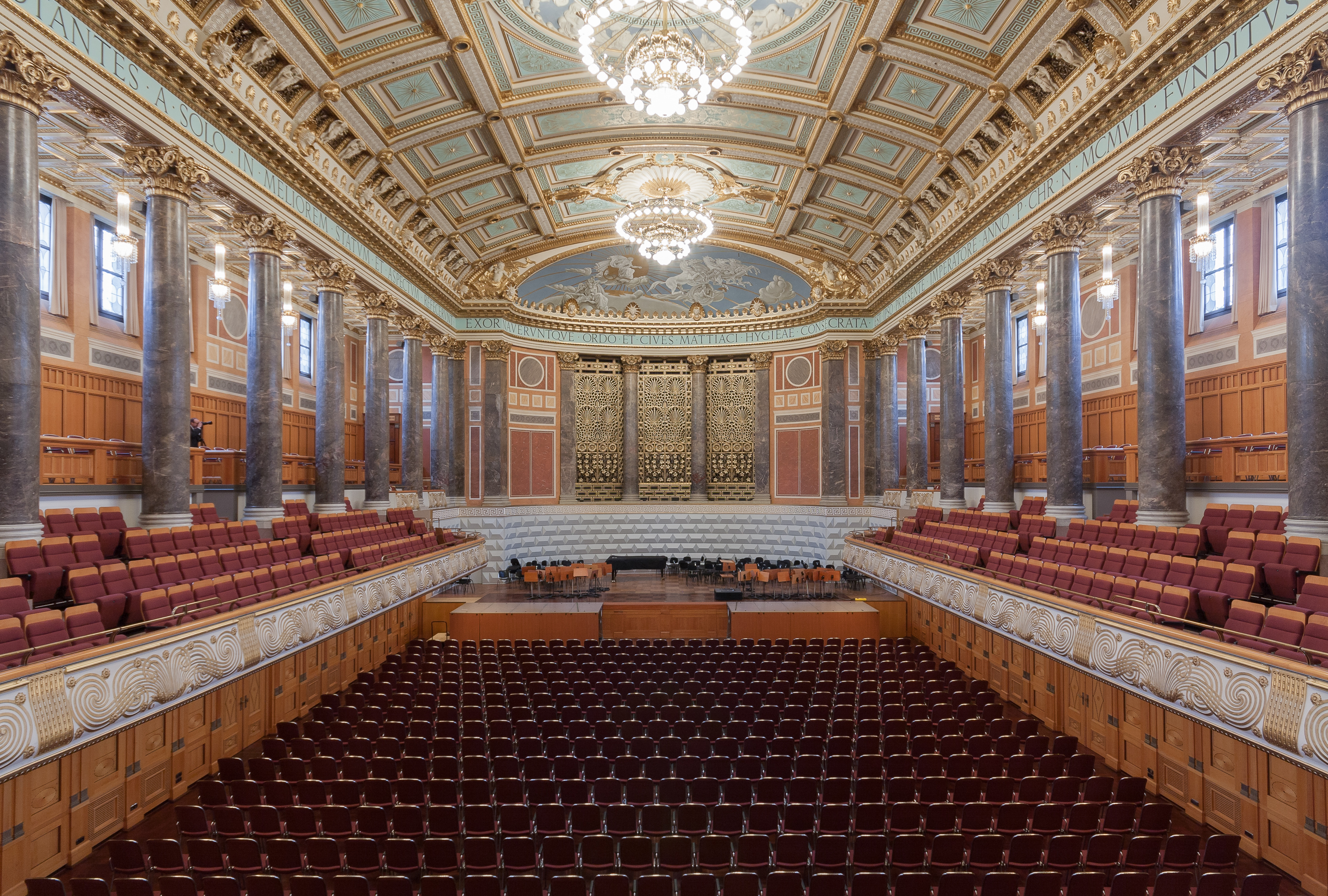
Friedrich von Thiersch Hall in the south wing, with the Kurhaus organ behind the grille

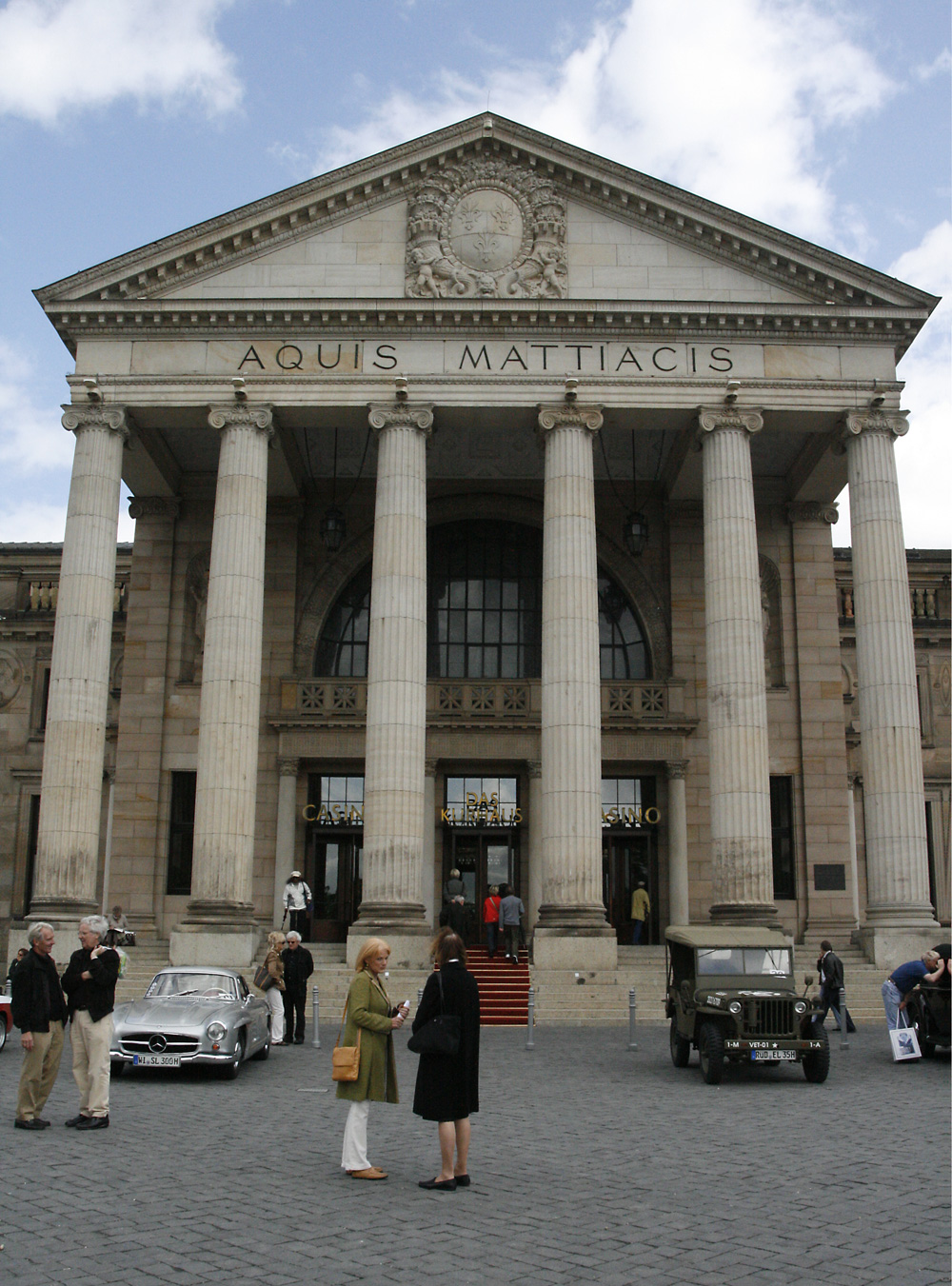
Portico, 2007

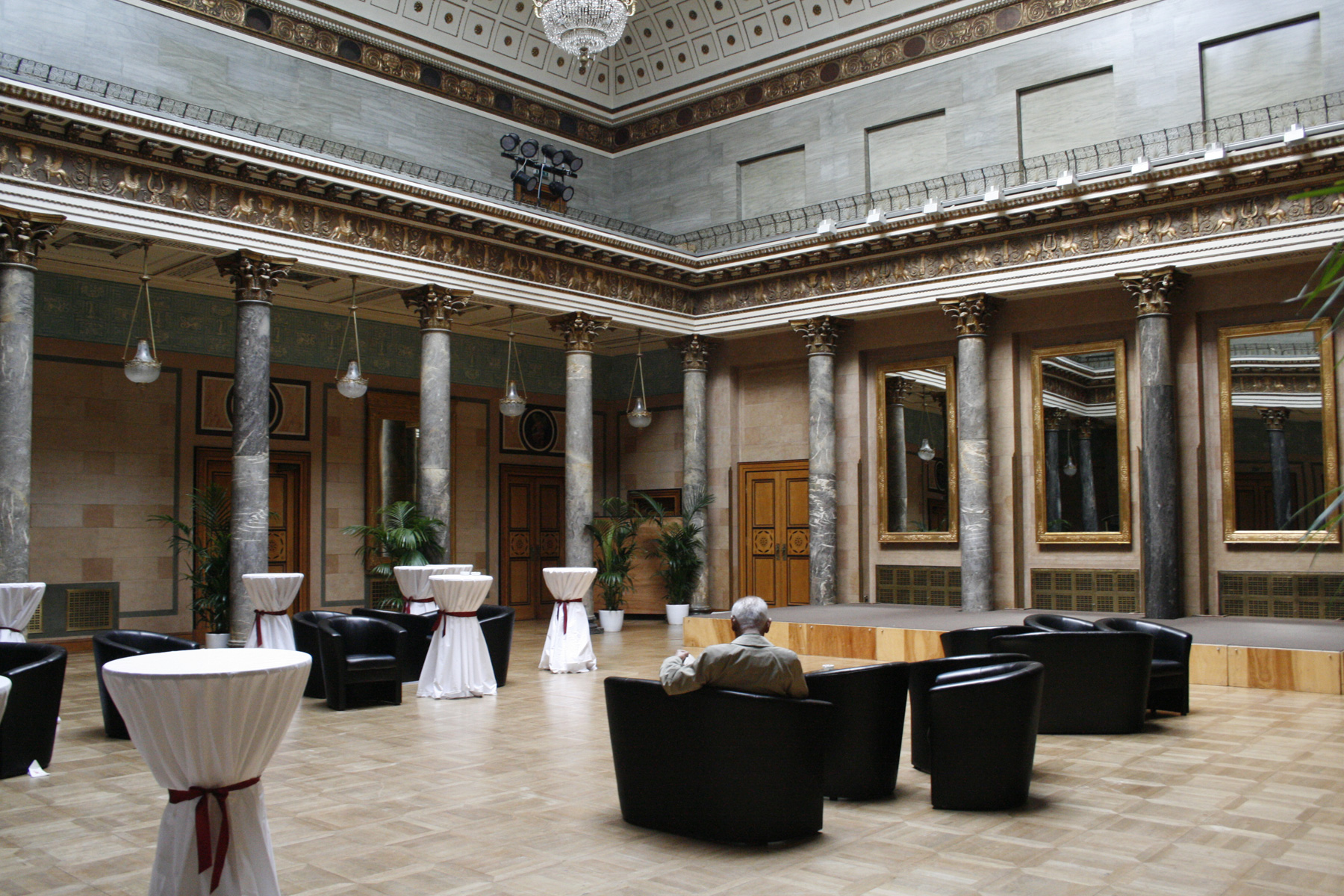
Christian Zais Hall, 2007

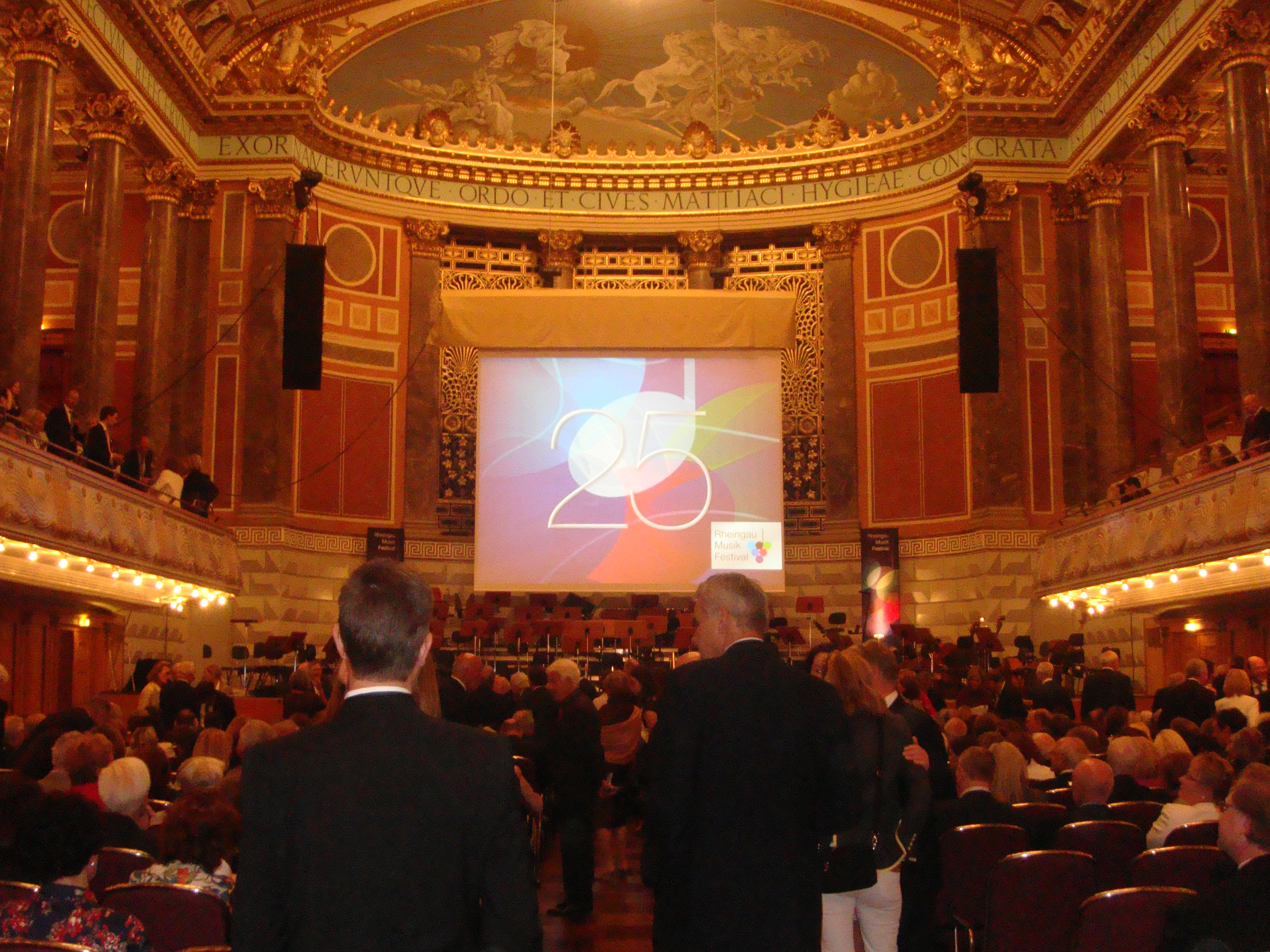
Thiersch Hall - 25 years Rheingau Musik Festival

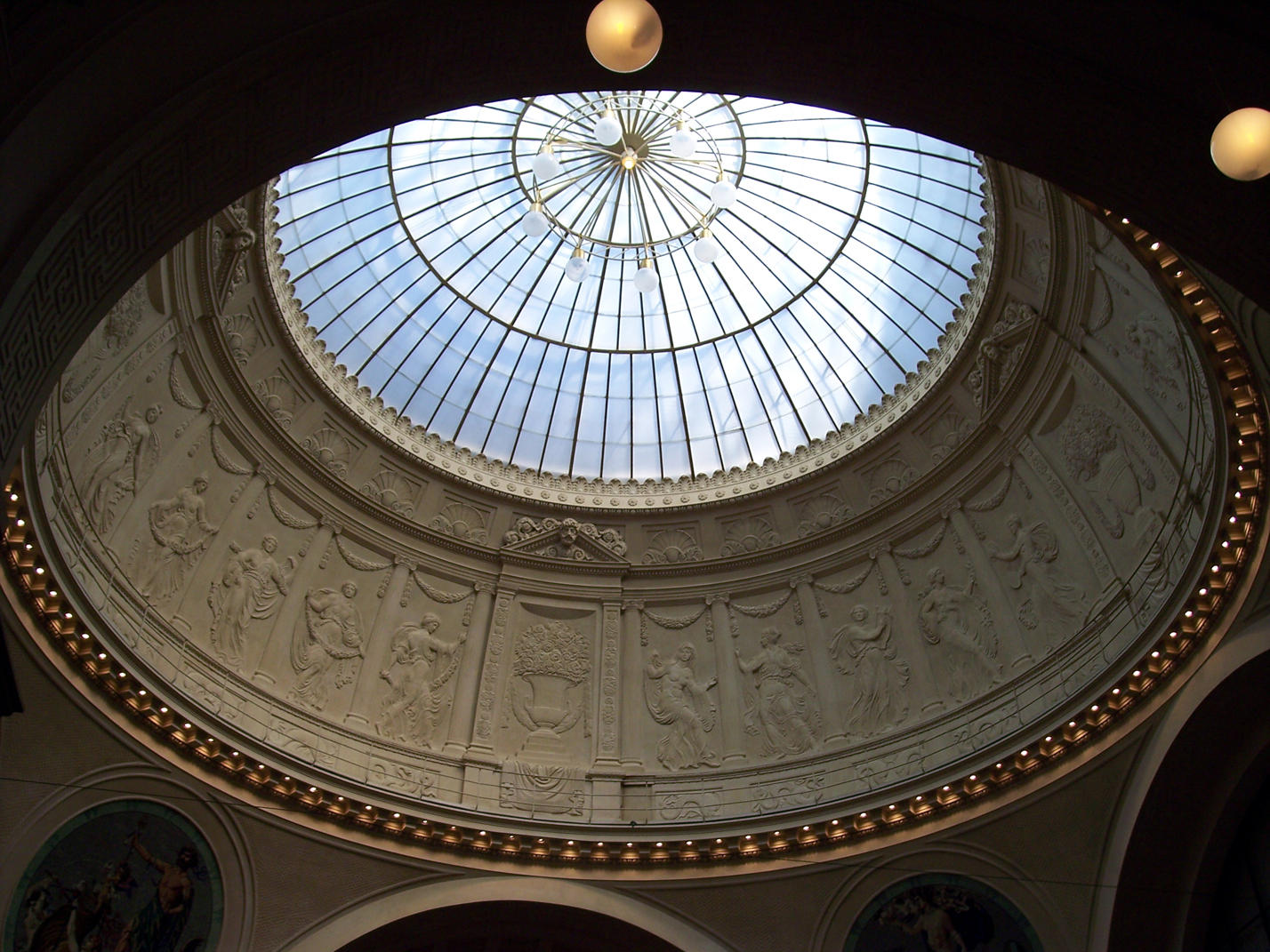
Foyer dome, 2005

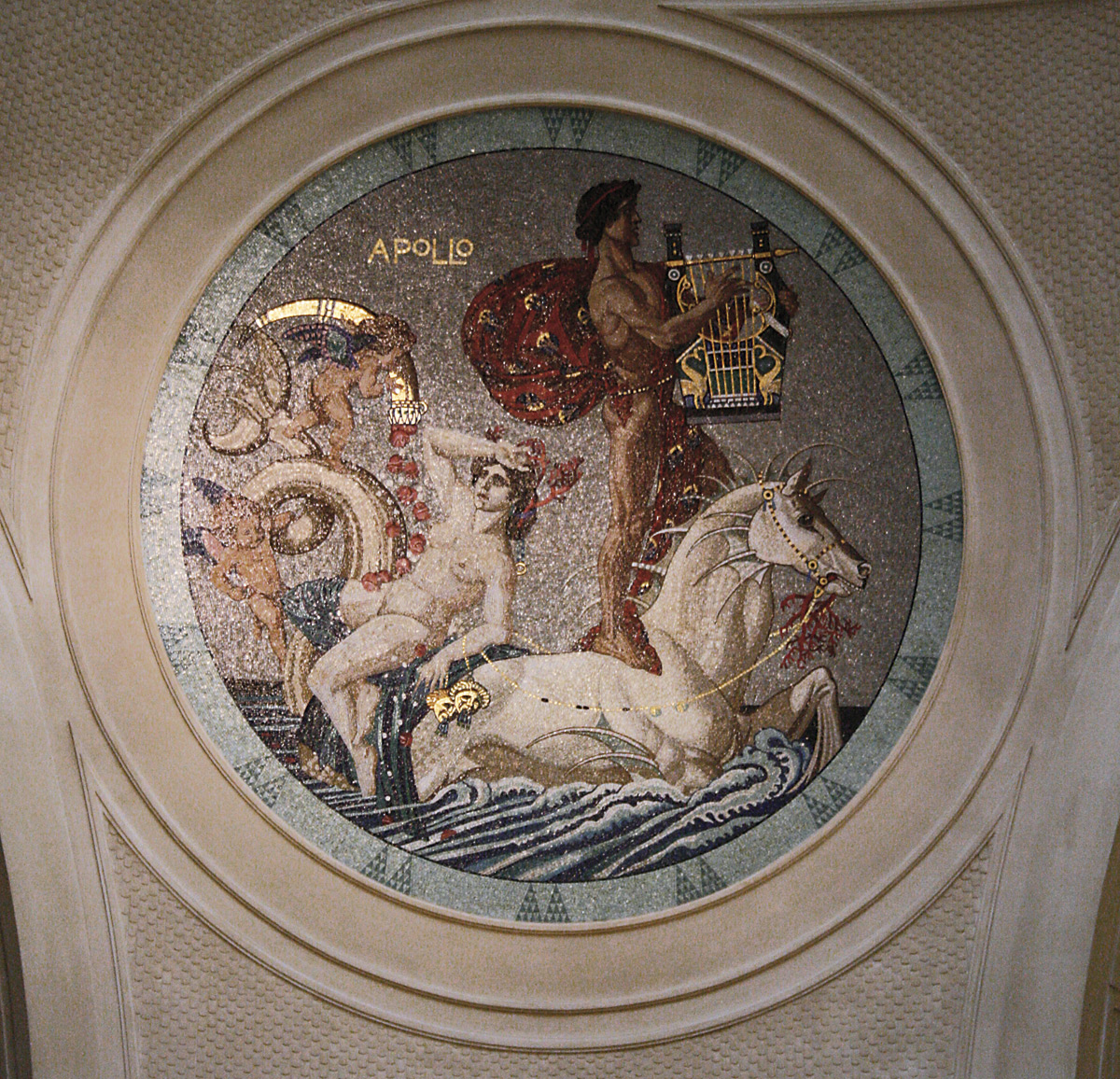
Apollo

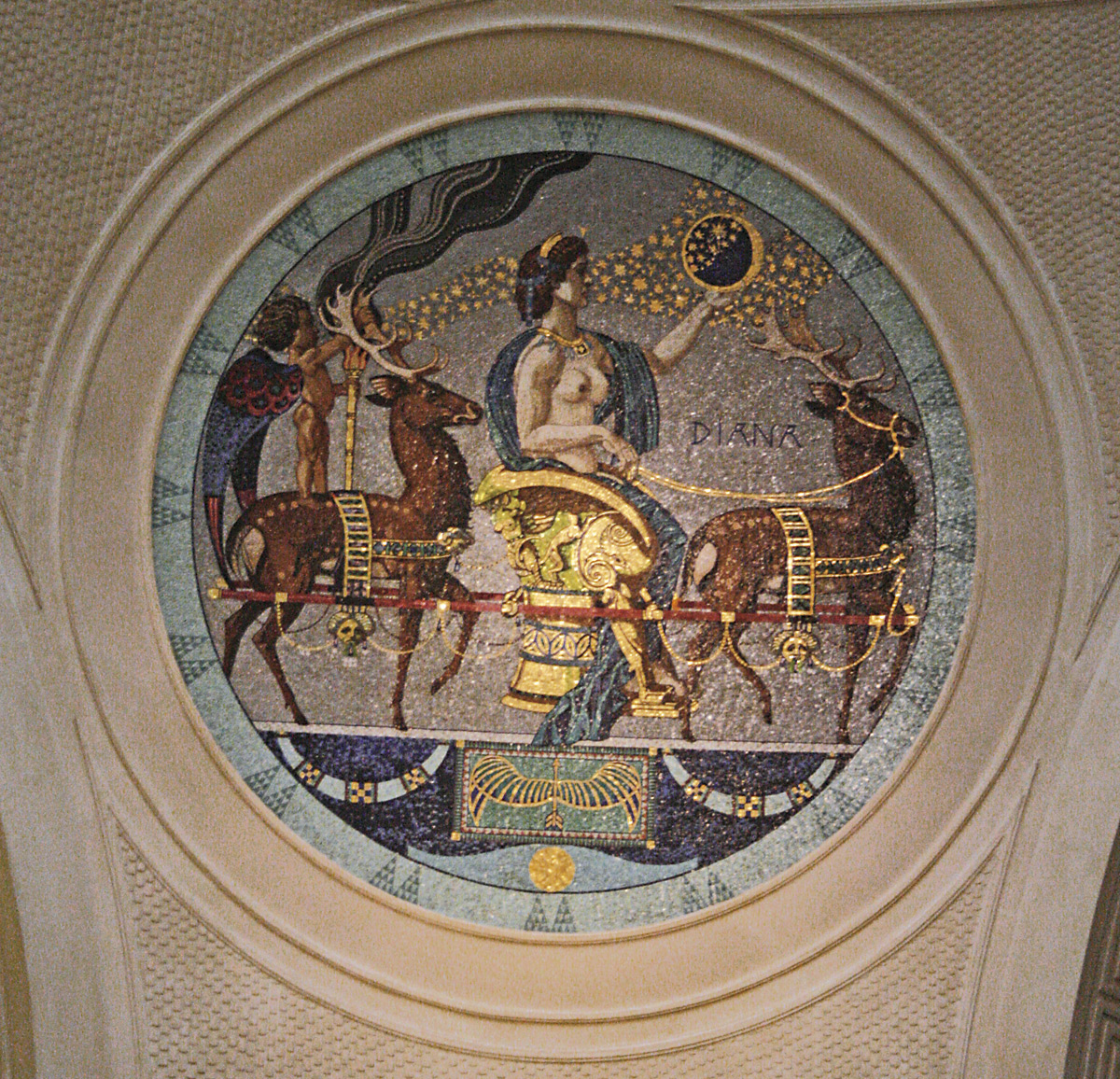
Diana

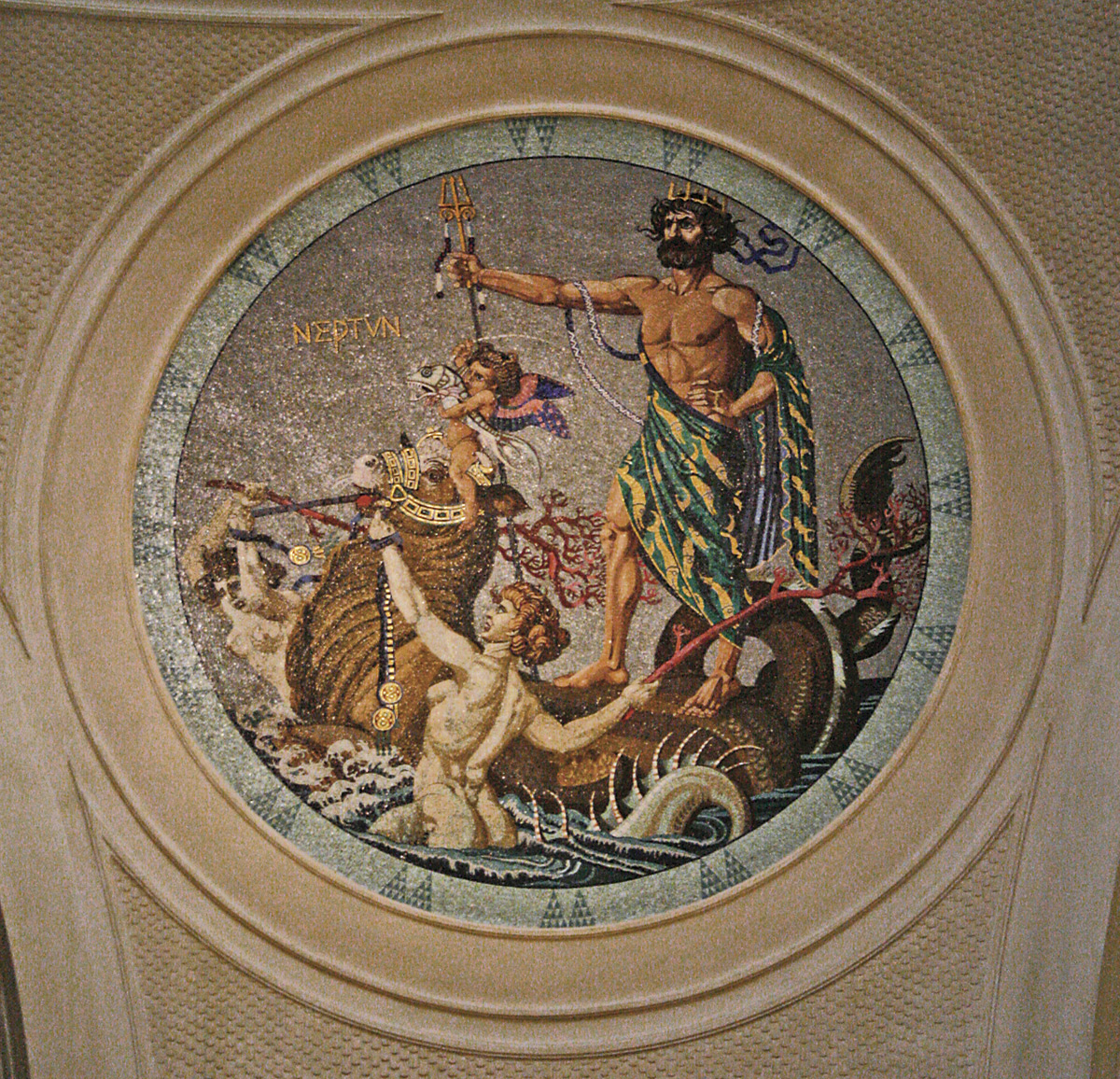
Neptune

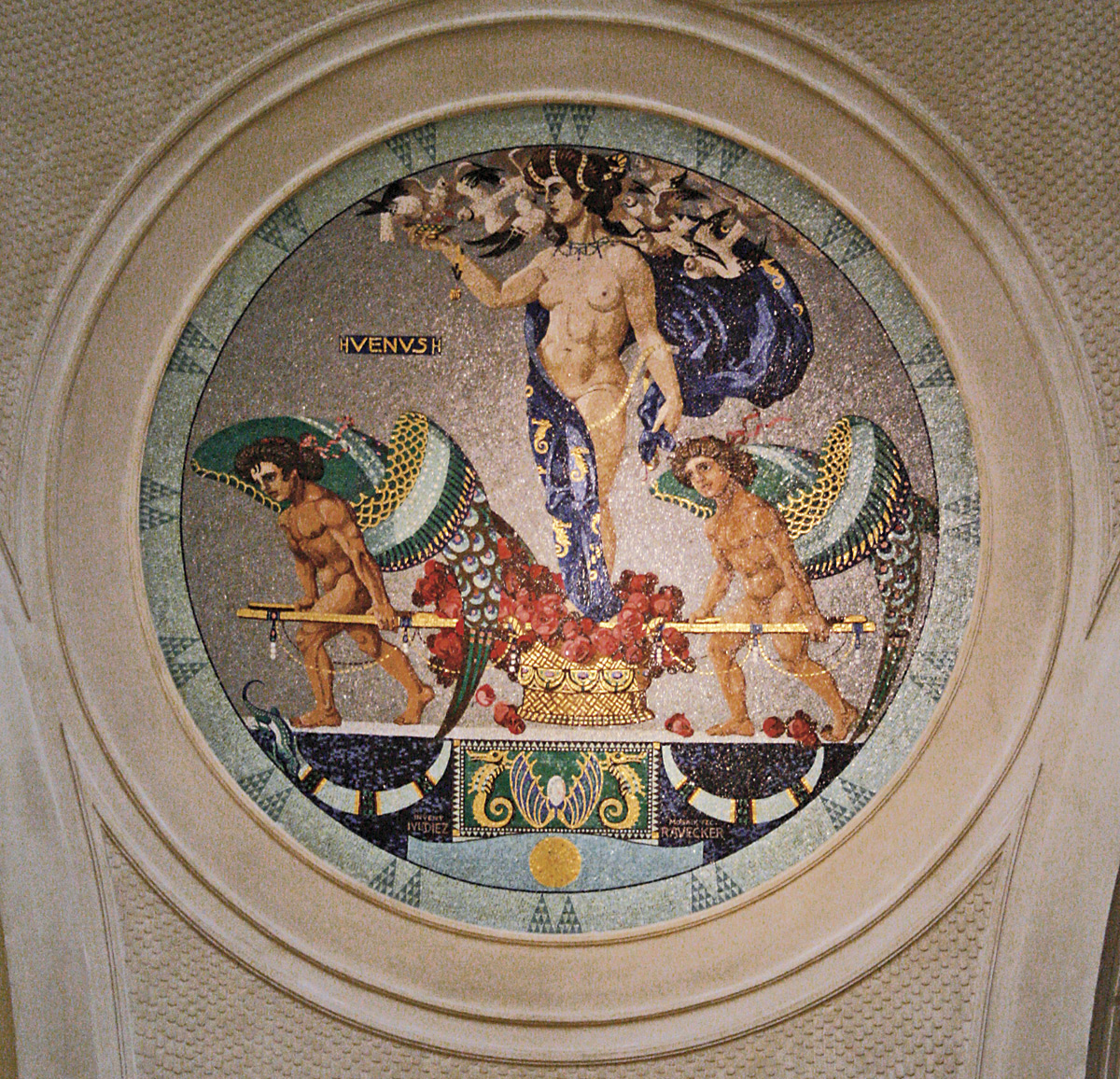
Venus
