= Hotel Nassauer Hof =

Building in Wiesbaden, Germany

Coordinates: 50°5′6″N 8°14′39″E

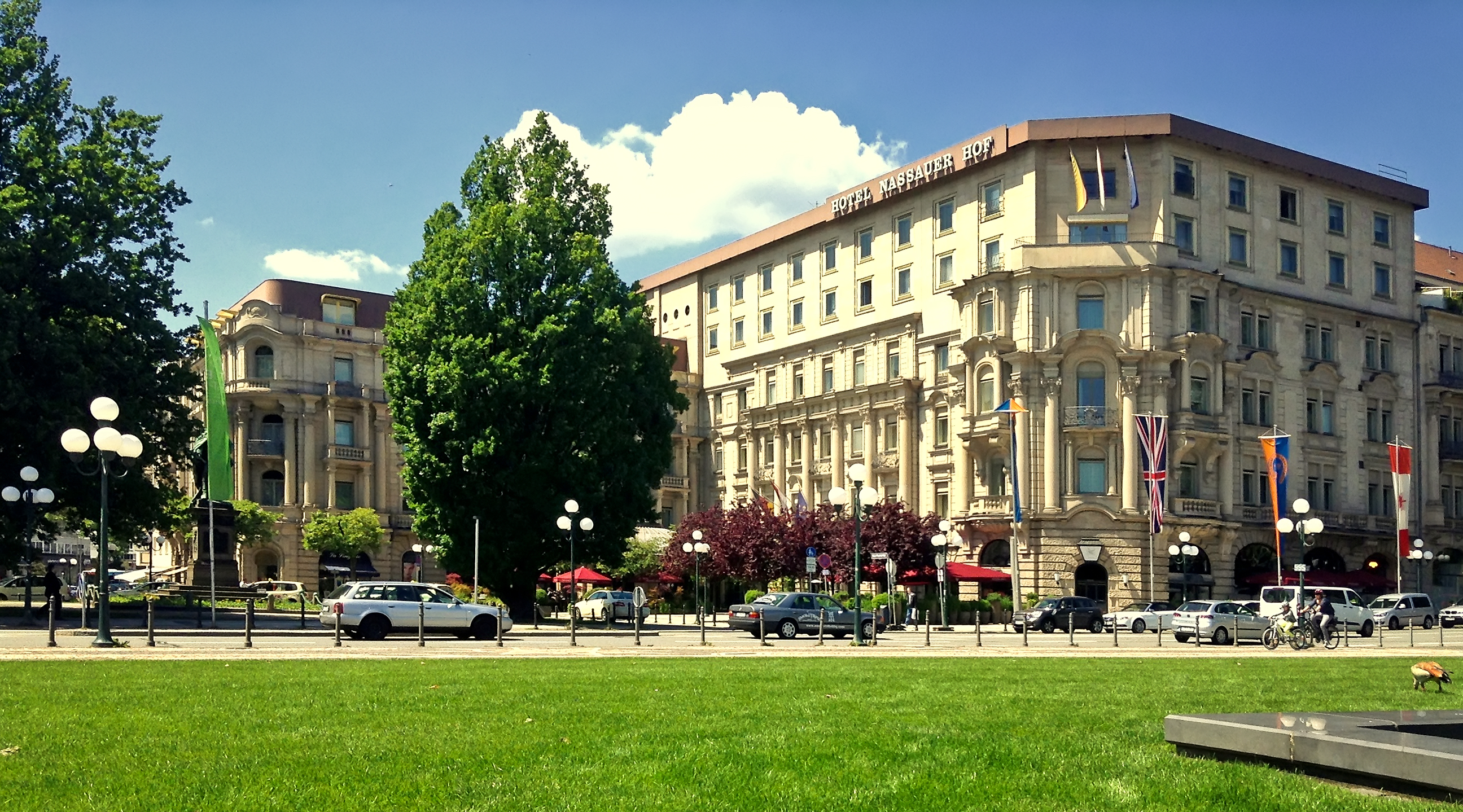
- The Hotel Nassauer Hof seen from Bowling Green park
- Interactive map of the Hotel Nassauer Hof area

General information
- Location: Wiesbaden, Kaiser-Friedrich-Platz 3-4; 65183 Wiesbaden
- Opening: 1813

Technical details
- Floor count: 5

Other information
- Number of rooms: 135
- Number of suites: 23
- Number of restaurants: 1

Website
- www.nassauer-hof.de

Nassauer Hof is a luxury five-star superior hotel in Wiesbaden, Germany, and member of the international association The Leading Hotels of the World as well as the German association Selektion Deutscher Luxushotels . The property was built in 1813 and is situated across from the Wiesbaden Kurhaus and at the end of Wiesbaden's luxury shopping avenue Wilhelmstrasse.

== Restaurant ==
Without a break, the hotel's restaurant ENTE has been awarded with a Michelin star for more than 30 years.

== Notable guests ==
- Fyodor Dostoyevsky
- Wilhelm II
- Nicholas II
- Louise of Belgium
- Walther Rathenau
- Paul von Hindenburg
- John F. Kennedy
- Richard Nixon
- Audrey Hepburn
- Luciano Pavarotti
- Reinhold Messner
- Dalai Lama
- Vladimir Putin
- Willem-Alexander & Máxima of the Netherlands
