= Kurpark, Wiesbaden =

Park in Wiesbaden, Germany

Coordinates: 50°05′04″N 08°15′06″E

Kurpark
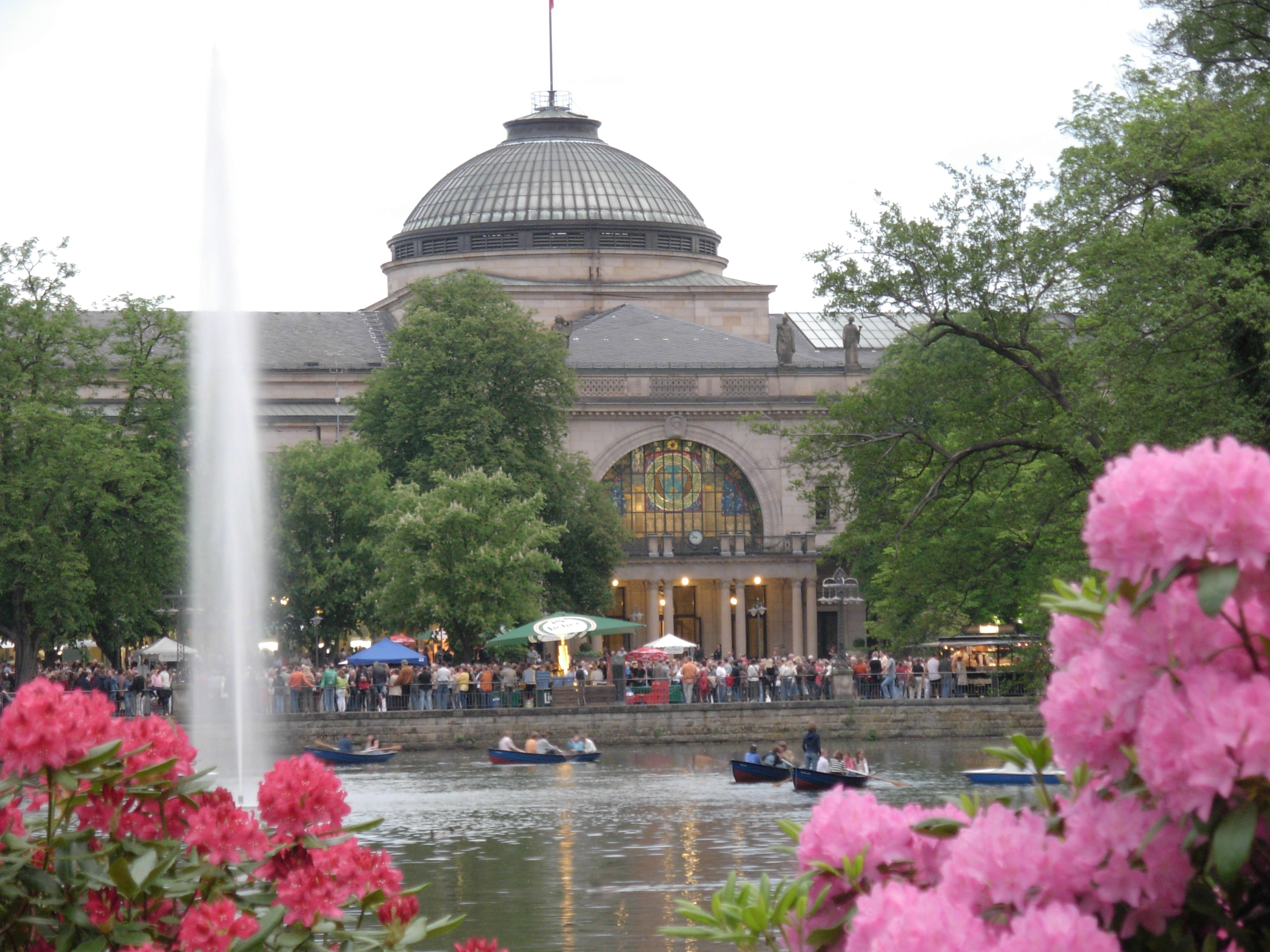
- The Kurhaus with the big pond
- Interactive map of Kurpark
- Location: Wiesbaden, Hesse, Germany
- Area: 75,000 m^{2} (810,000 sq ft)
- Created: 1852

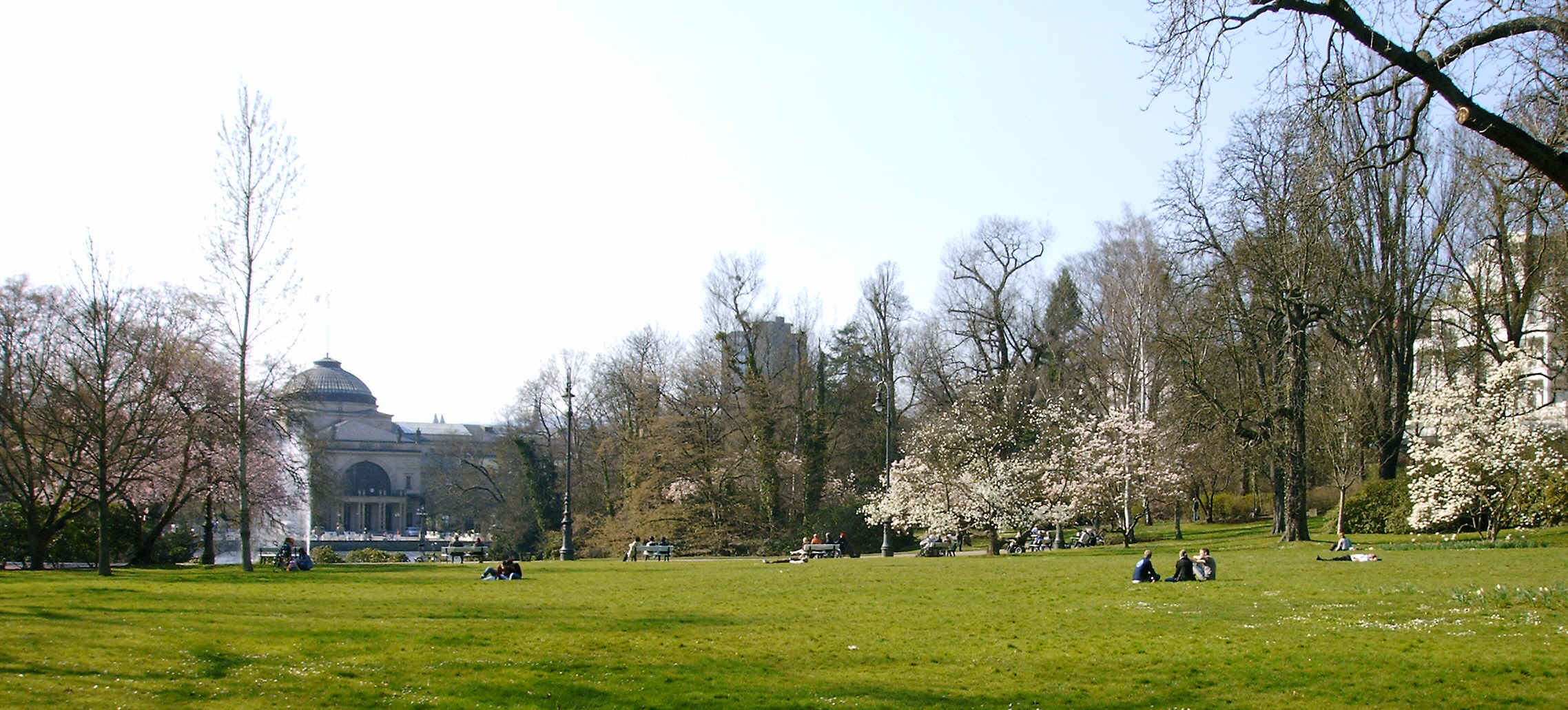
The park in spring

The Kurpark, German for "Spa Park", is a public park in the centre of Wiesbaden, Germany, stretching from the Wilhelmstraße to the southern borders of the district of Sonneberg and lying immediately behind the Kurhaus convention center. It was created in 1852 as an English landscape park and includes a lake where boats can be rented, and a 6 metres (20 ft) tall fountain. It has been described as the most beautiful park in Wiesbaden.
