= Wiesbaden-Mitte =

Mitte
- Borough of Wiesbaden
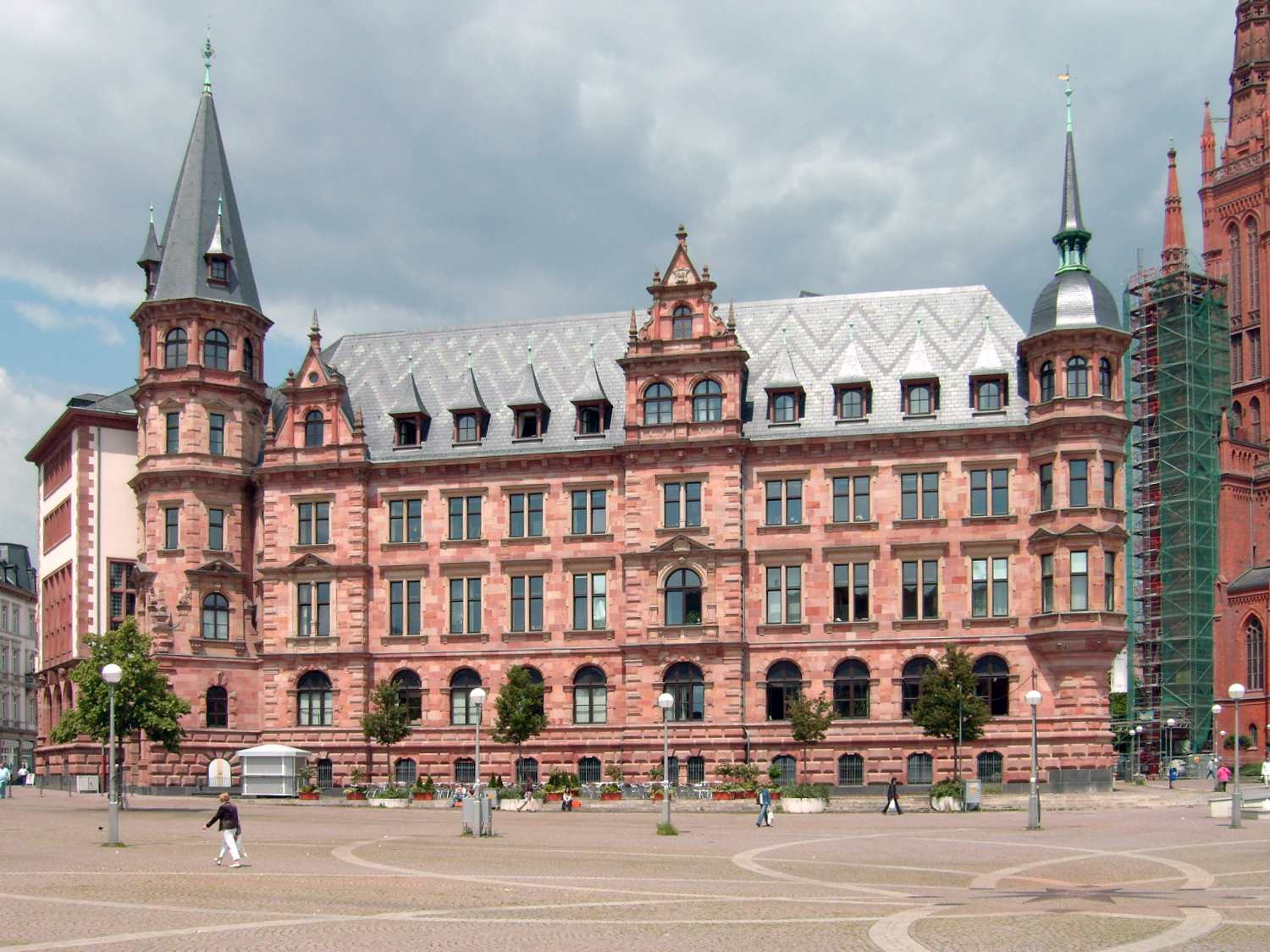
- New Town Hall

- Coat of arms

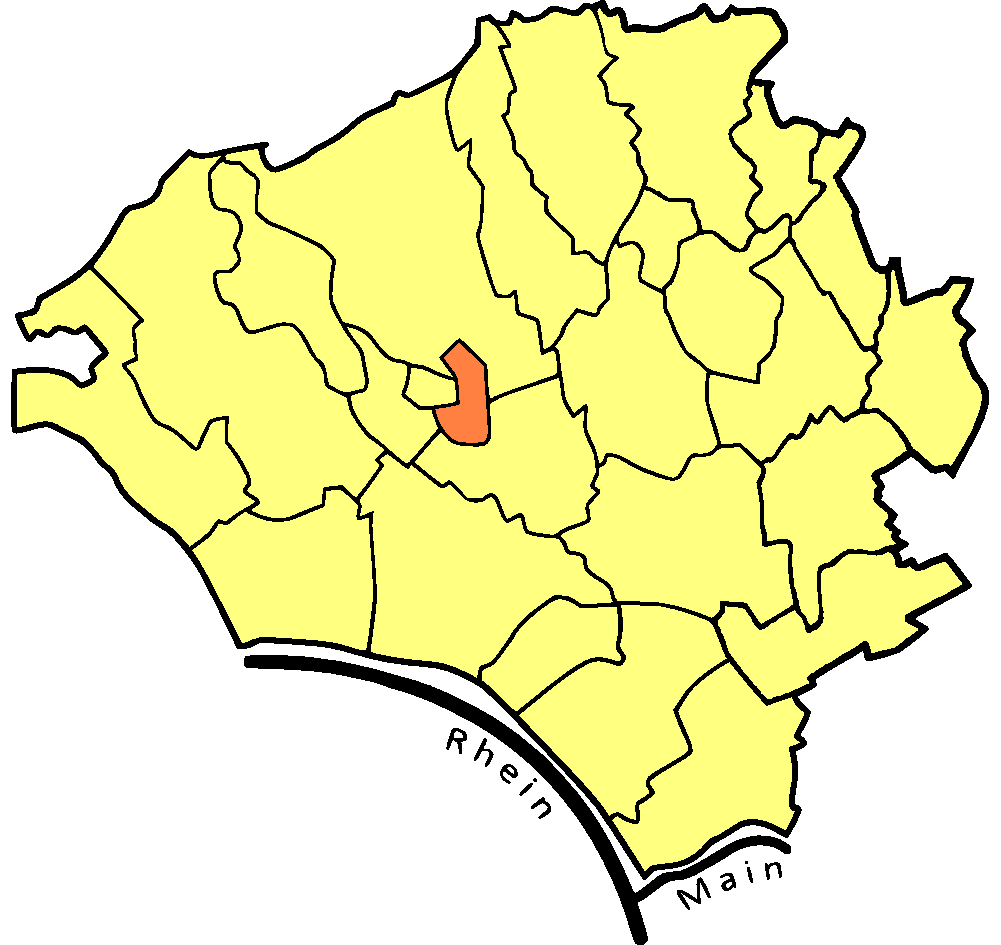
- Location of Mitte in Wiesbaden
- Interactive map of Mitte
- Location within Germany Location within Hesse
- Coordinates: 50°04′54″N 8°14′28″E
- Country: Germany
- State: Hesse
- District: Urban district
- City: Wiesbaden

Government
  - Mayor: Guido Haas (Greens)

Area
  - Total: 1.53 km^{2} (0.59 sq mi)

Population (2020-12-31)
  - Total: 22,438
  - Density: 14,700/km^{2} (38,000/sq mi)
- Time zone: UTC+01:00 (CET)
  - Summer (DST): UTC+02:00 (CEST)
- Postal codes: 65183, 65185, 65193
- Dialling codes: 0611

Mitte is a borough of the city of Wiesbaden, Hesse, Germany. With over 21,000 inhabitants, it is one of the most-populated of Wiesbaden's boroughs. It is located in the centre of the city.

== Places and Buildings of Interest ==
- Schloßplatz
  - Altes Rathaus
  - Neues Rathaus
  - Marktkirche
  - Stadtschloss, today Hessischer Landtag
- Dernsches Gelände
  - Backside from Neues Rathaus
- Wilhelmstraße
- Hessische Staatskanzlei / Kranzplatz
- Kochbrunnenplatz / Kranzplatz
- Taunusstrasse (English: Taunus Street)

== Sources ==
- Derived from German Wikipedia
