= Pentagon (Wiesbaden) =

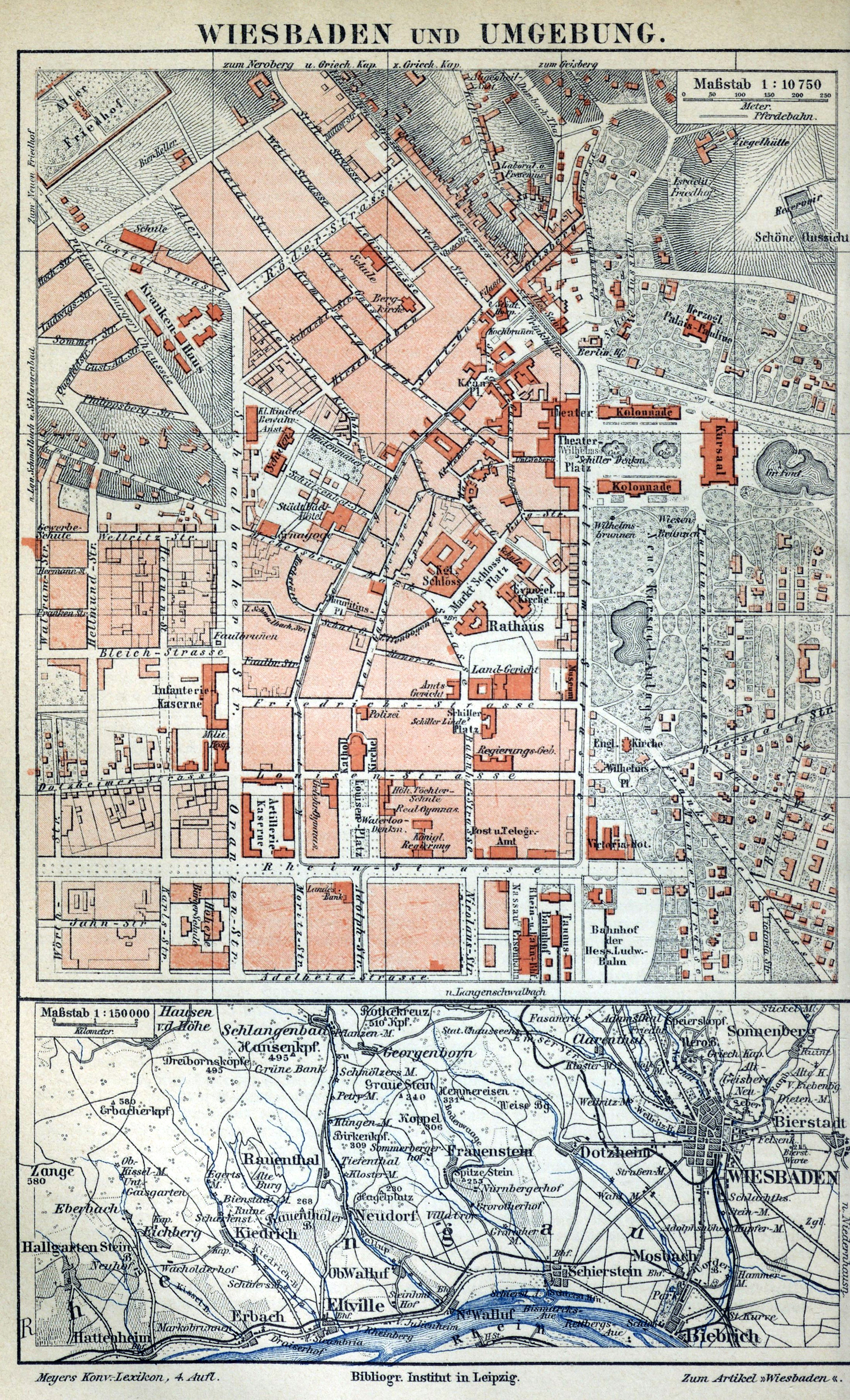
Historical pentagon (centered, around 1890)

The Historical pentagon represents the historic core of the Hessian capital Wiesbaden. It is bordered to the south of the Rheinstraße, to the west of the Schwalbacher Straße, north of the Röderstraße and Taunusstrasse and to the east of the Wilhelmstrasse. These roads form a pentagon enclosing the old town of Wiesbaden. The development outside this street line did not start until the second half of the 19th century.

== Background ==
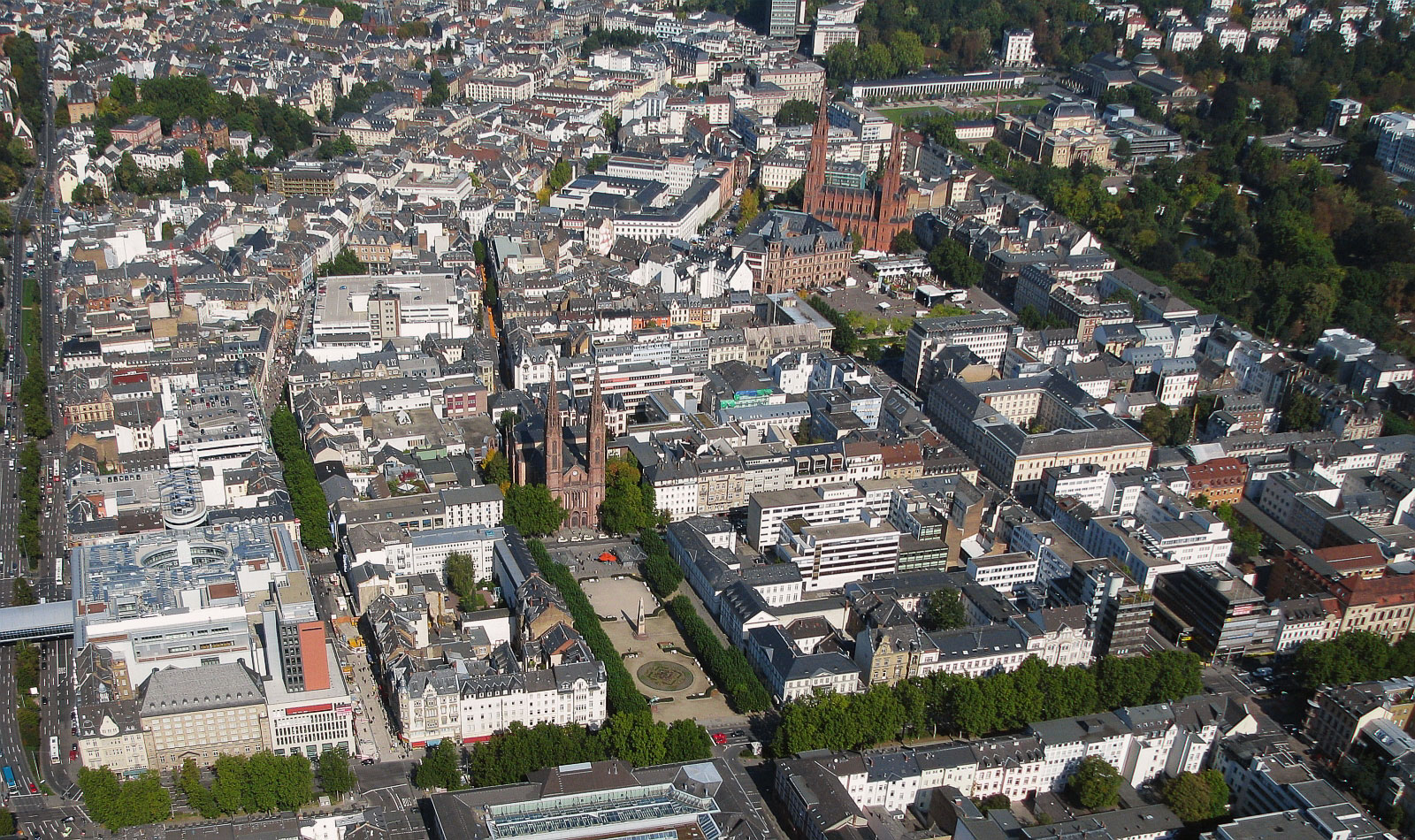
The Rheinstraße (in front), Schwalbacher Straße (left), Röder- and Taunusstraße (top) and Wilhelmstraße (right) are forming the Historical pentagon

Within the pentagon of the medieval city layout is located with many historic buildings, including the City Palace of the Dukes of Nassau on Schloßplatz and Old Town Hall and the oldest surviving building in the city dating from Roman times, the Heidenmauer (Wiesbaden) (pagan wall).

The Historical pentagon goes back to the year 1818, when the Wiesbaden city builder and architect Christian Zais presented first building plans and expert evidence for an urban extension in which this approach was adopted
