= Kochbrunnen =

Coordinates: 50.086331°N 8.241913°E

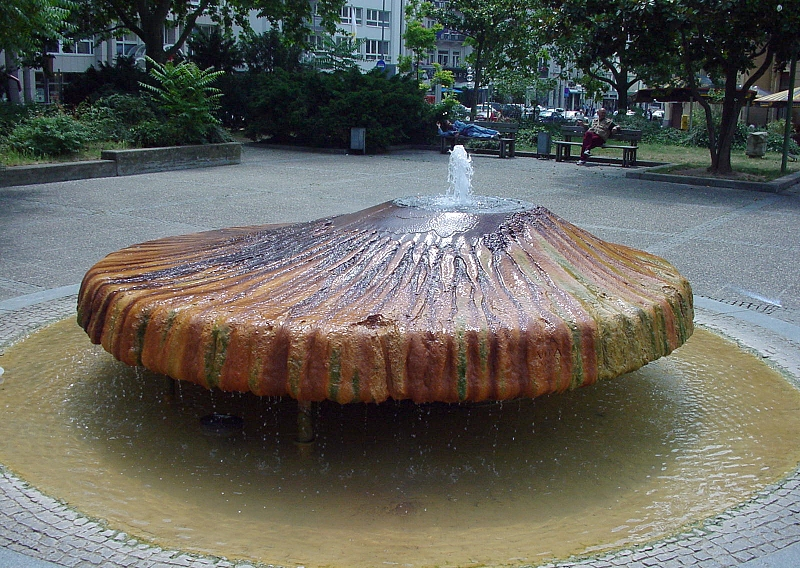
Kochbrunnen

The Kochbrunnen (in German: boil fountain) in Wiesbaden is the most famous hot spring in city. It is a sodium chloride hot spring. Its name refers to the water temperature of about 66 °C.

The spring in the Kochbrunnenplatz was first mentioned in 1366 as Bryeborn (Brühborn) and 1536 as Syedenborn (Siedeborn). The productivity is about 360 litres every minute. The fountain has well water when exiting, at a temperature of 66.1 °C, smells faintly of hydrogen sulphide and has a strong salty taste. It is clear, but becomes turbid yellowish after 24 hours exposed to the air. The main flow is directed to the processing plant in the Kaiser-Friedrich-Bad. From there it passes into the extensive thermal water system of the city. It is used both for medicinal purposes (including in the hot springs in Aukammtal), as well as to heat the city hall.

Kochbrunnenplatz and neighbouring Kranzplatz host some of the Wiesbaden Grand Hotels: the oldest hotel in Germany, the "Schwarze Bock" founded in 1486; the former "Palace Hotel" – it was the first ever with room phones – and the "Hotel Rose", built in 1872–73, which hosts the Hessische Staatskanzlei since 2004.
