= Georg Moller =

German Architect (1784 – 1852)

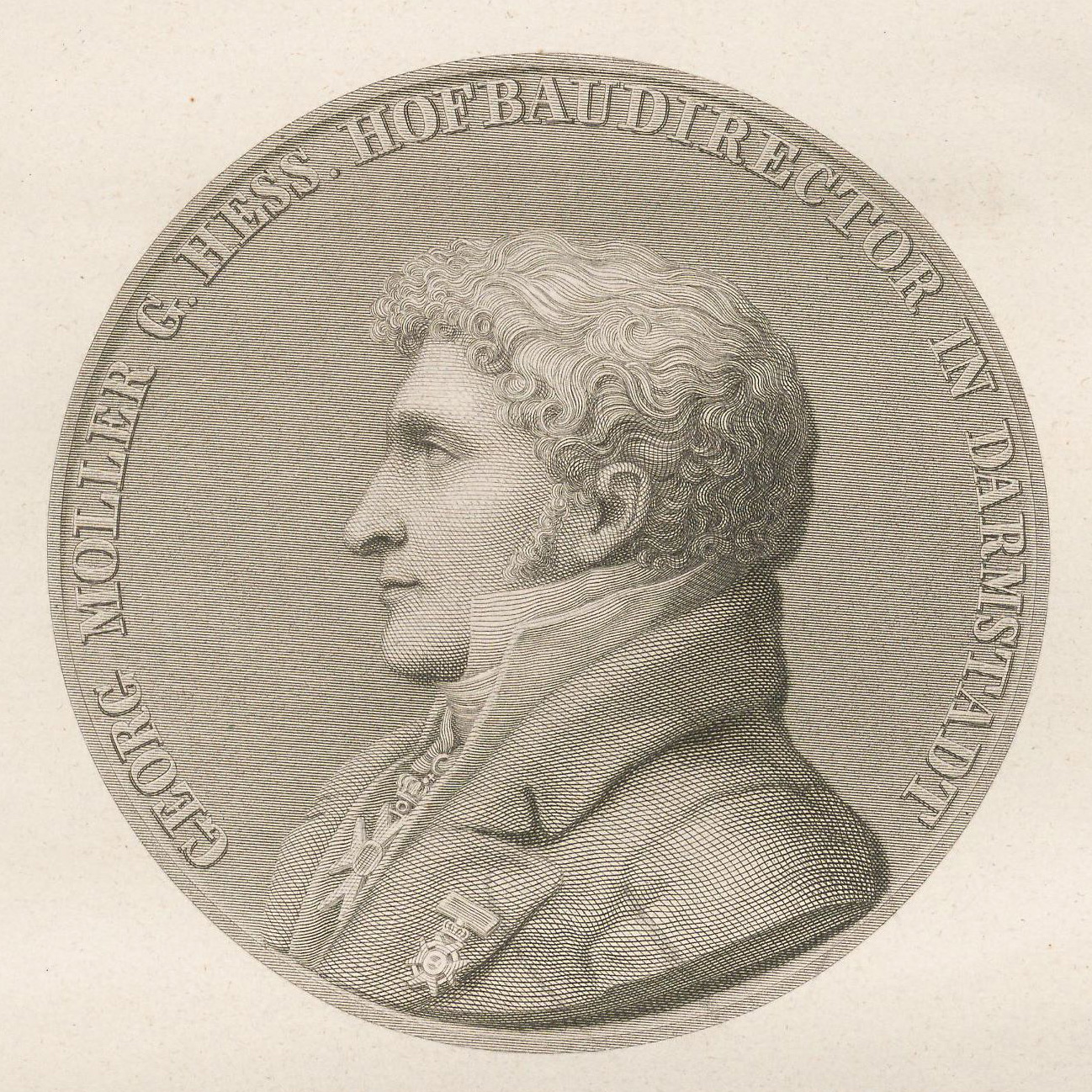
- Georg Moller, prior to 1852
- Born: 21 January 1784; Diepholz, Holy Roman Empire
- Died: 13 March 1852 (aged 68); Darmstadt, Grand Duchy of Hesse
- Occupation: Architect
- Buildings: Staatstheater Mainz; Stadtschloss Wiesbaden; Landestheater Darmstadt

Georg Moller (21 January 1784 – 13 March 1852) was an architect and a town planner who worked in the South of Germany, mostly in the region today known as Hessen.

== Life and family background ==
Moller was born in Diepholz, a descendant of an old Norwegian family of clergy, who were known in the 17th century for publishing protestant songbooks. His father, Levin Adolf Moller, grew up in Westphalia and became a notary in Celle, and from 1777 worked as an advocate and attorney-at-law in Diepholz. Moller's mother, Elisabeth von Castelmur, originated in an old Swiss family of nobility from the Upper Engadin district of Switzerland. Therefore, Moller grew up in a well-situated family.

In 1800, after finishing secondary school Moller began studying architecture with Christian Ludwig Witte in Hannover. Here he was introduced to Friedrich Weinbrenner whom he followed to Karlsruhe in 1802, to continue studies at a school for building trades. During the years 1807–1809 Moller took a study trip to Rome where he gained crucial insight from members of the Roman colony of German artists. After finishing this journey he became a construction superintendent in 1810 and was hired as court master builder of the Grand Duchy of Hesse.

Among his major works in this capacity are St. Ludwig, the first Roman Catholic church building in Darmstadt since the Reformation — a building whose forms were inspired by the Pantheon in Rome – the former Landestheater, the Luisenplatz and the Masonic Lodge, what today is the "Moller-Haus". Furthermore, he designed the Staatstheater Mainz, which created a stir because of its semicircular facade, and the Stadtschloss Wiesbaden of the Dukes of Nassau, today the seat of the Landtag of Hesse. From 1843 to 1847 Moller was commissioned by Grand-Duke Ludwig II. to overview the restoration of Schloss Biedenkopf.

Only two of Georg Moller's major works survived the second world war without damages: the grand-ducal mausoleum at the Rosenhöhe and the Ludwigsmonument on the Luisenplatz, both of them in Darmstadt. The other buildings Moller designed were damaged beyond repair or were reconstructed in a more simple design.

Moller was also responsible for the reconstruction of the castles in Bad Homburg and Meisenheim, the latter called Wolfgangsbau, for the Landgrave of Hesse-Homburg. He also worked for prince Klemens von Metternich, redesigning his castle Schloss Johannisberg. He worked in Hannover as well.

Moller is considered, along with Karl Friedrich Schinkel and Leo von Klenze, to be one of the important German architects working in the Greek Revival and Romanticist styles. His ingenuity as an engineer and when working space is most evident in the Ludwigskirche in Darmstadt.

Aside his work as an architect Moller was successful as a preserver of buildings. He was at least partly responsible for preserving the Carolingian Torhalle in Lorsch, which today is part of the UNESCO World Heritage Site. Moller in 1818 convinced the Grand-Duke of Hessen-Darmstadt to edict the first ordinance of preservation of ancient buildings, the first law concerning the protection of historic buildings in Germany.

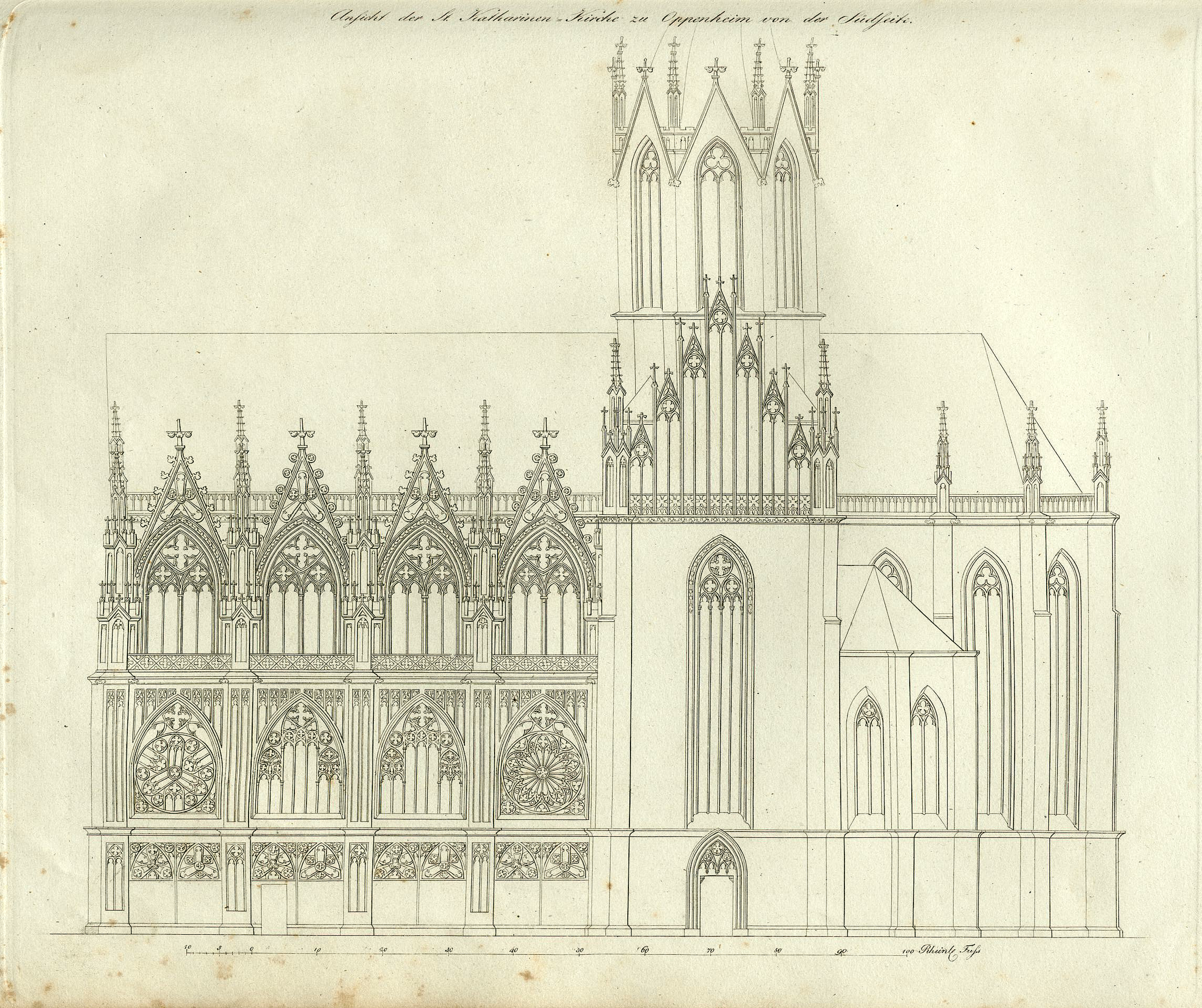
South Elevation of the Katharinenkirche, Oppenheim. From: Denkmähler der deutschen Baukunst

Moller was also well-known for his writings on architecture. His book Denkmähler der Deutschen Baukunst ("Milestones in German architecture"; 1815–1851) covered buildings from Lorsch (founded 764) to Oppenheim (14th century). The work is notable both for its scholarship and for the quality of its illustrations. He was one of the first to take a stylistic approach to dating of buildings rather than accepting all recorded dates. An English translation of the text was published in 1836. He also wrote Beiträge zu der Lehre von den Konstruktionen ("Contributions to knowledge on construction"; 1833–1844).

Moller also played an important role for the completion of Cologne Cathedral. It was he who discovered one half of the original 13.25 feet (4.04 m) facade drawing by cathedral masterbuilder Arnold in an attic near Darmstadt, while the other half was found by Sulpiz Boisserée in Paris in 1816. The uncompleted cathedral was completed in accordance with these designs.

Moller died in Darmstadt, aged 68.

== Architects Georg Moller educated ==
- Rudolf Wiegmann
- Gottfried Bandhauer (possible)

== Gallery ==
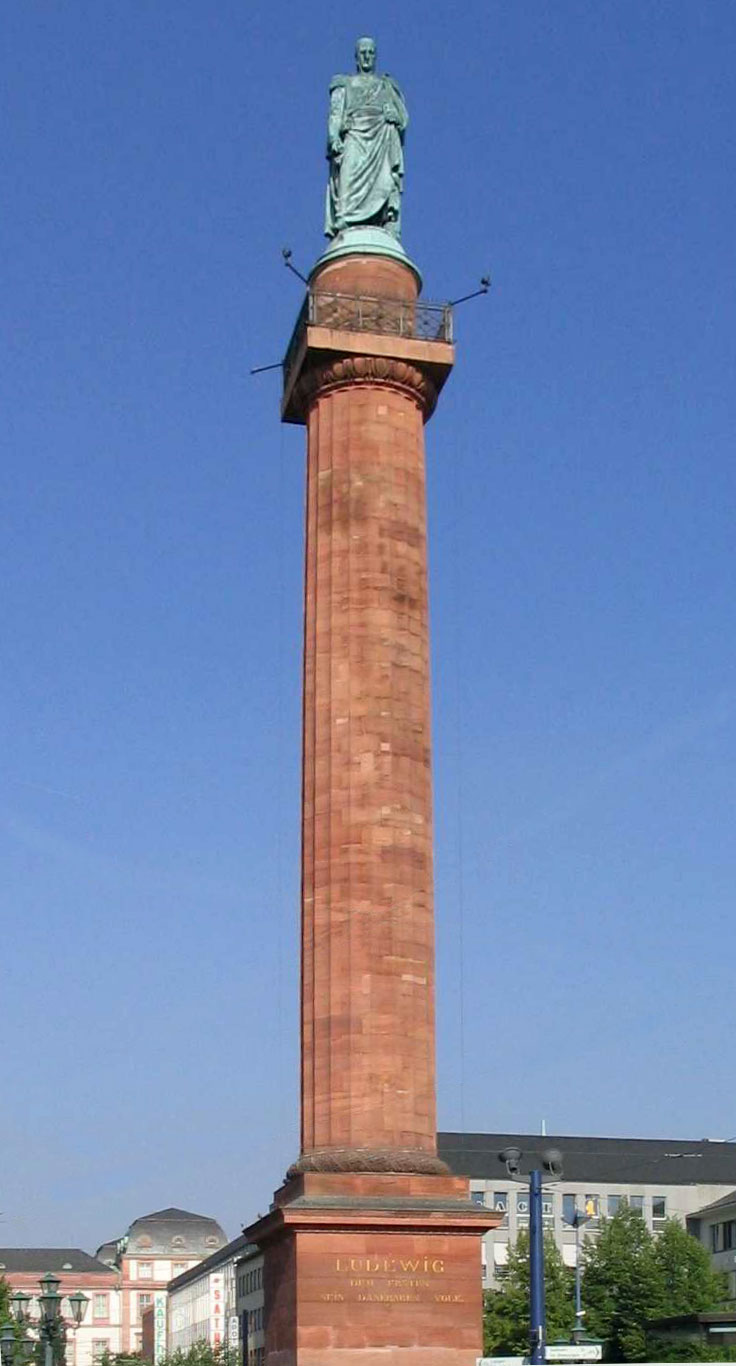
Ludwigsmonument in Darmstadt

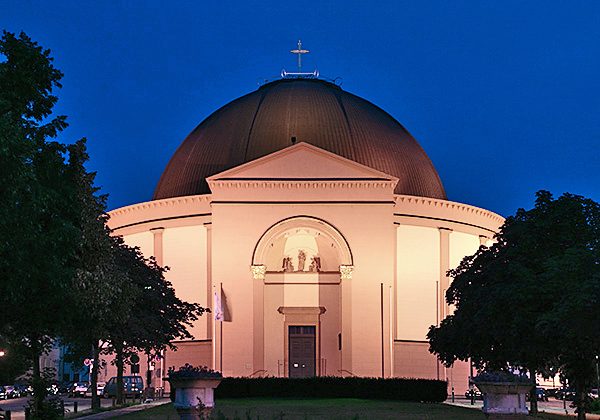
Ludwigskirche in Darmstadt

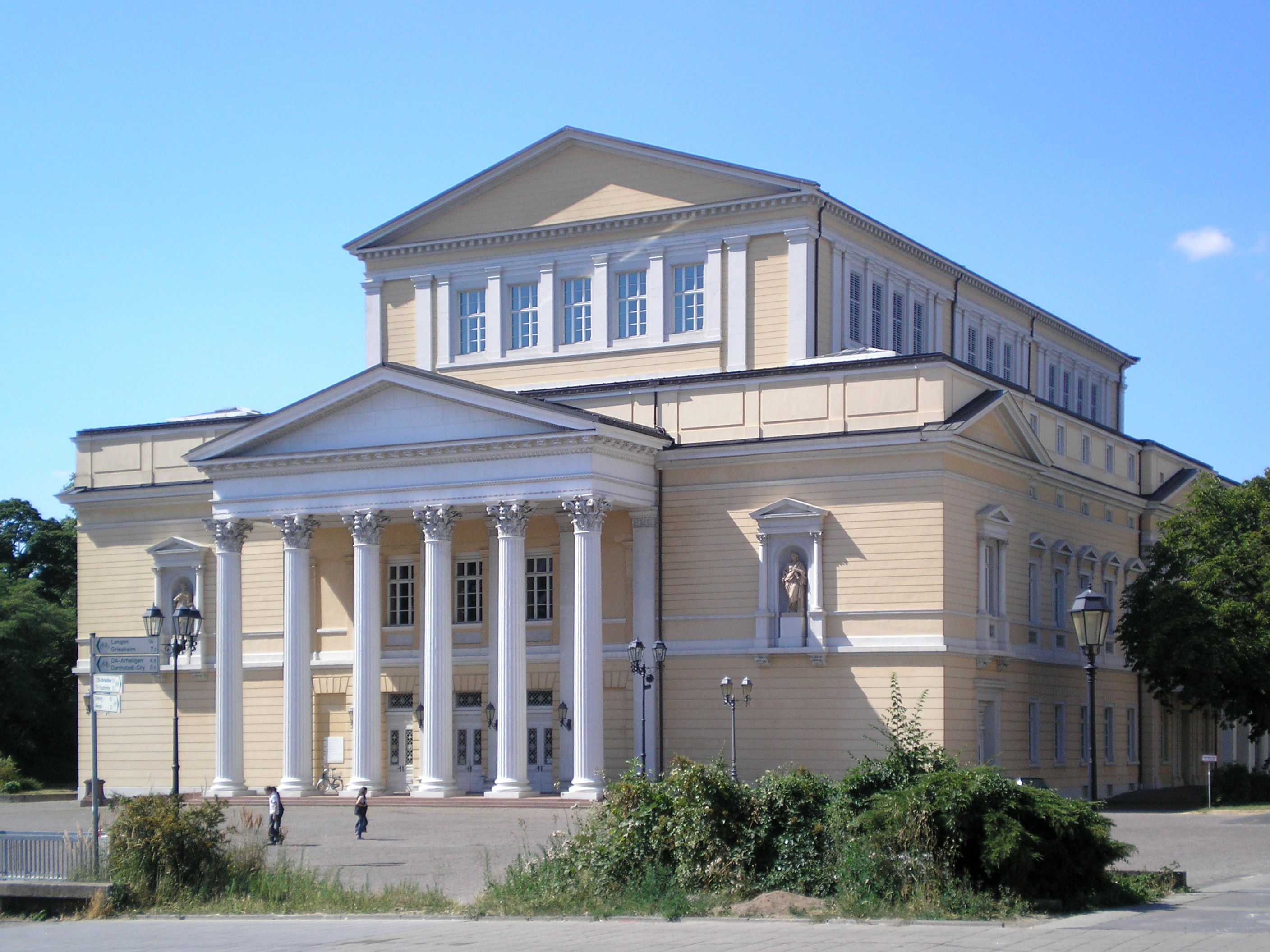
House of History, Darmstadt

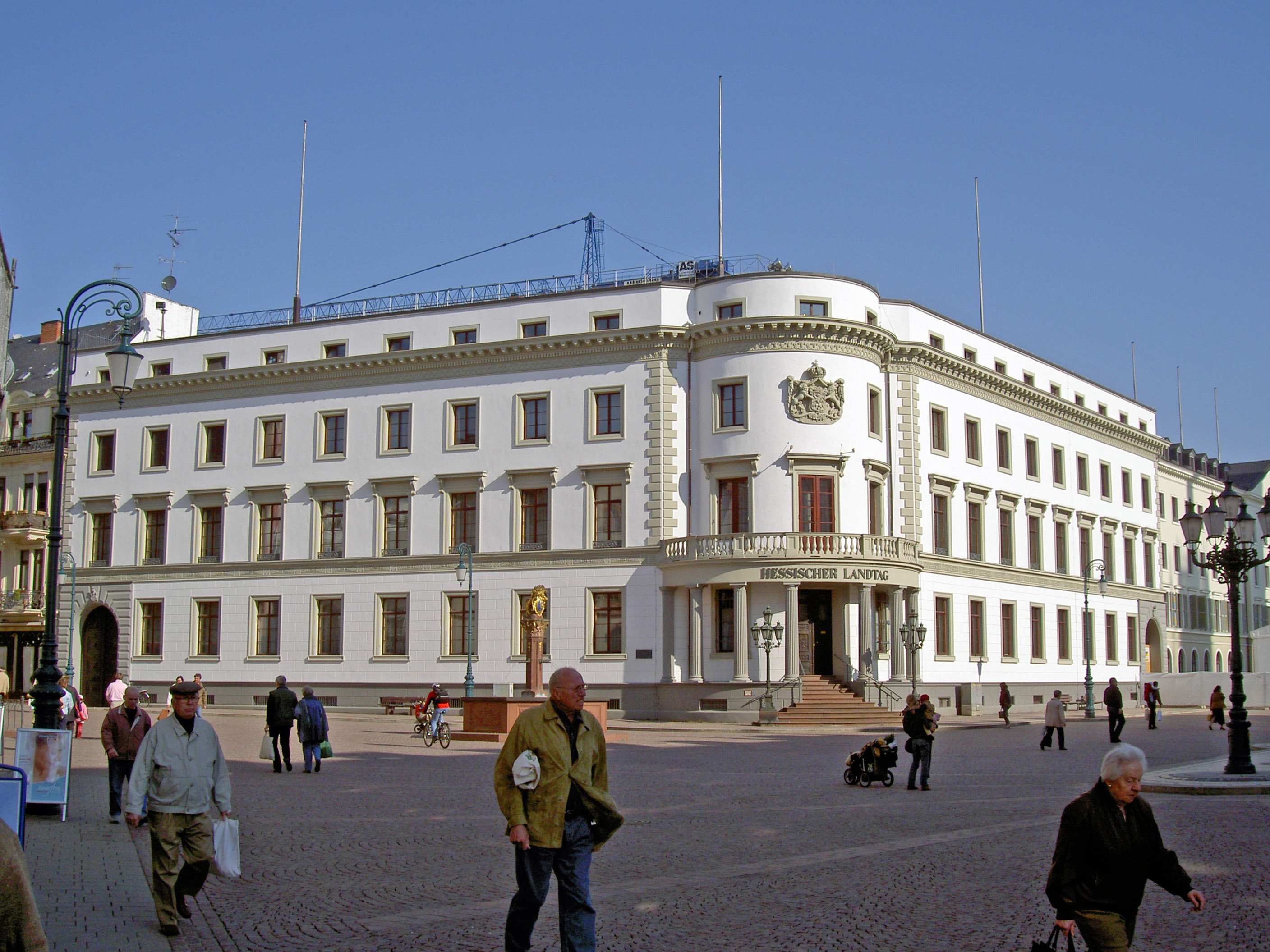
Stadtschloss in Wiesbaden

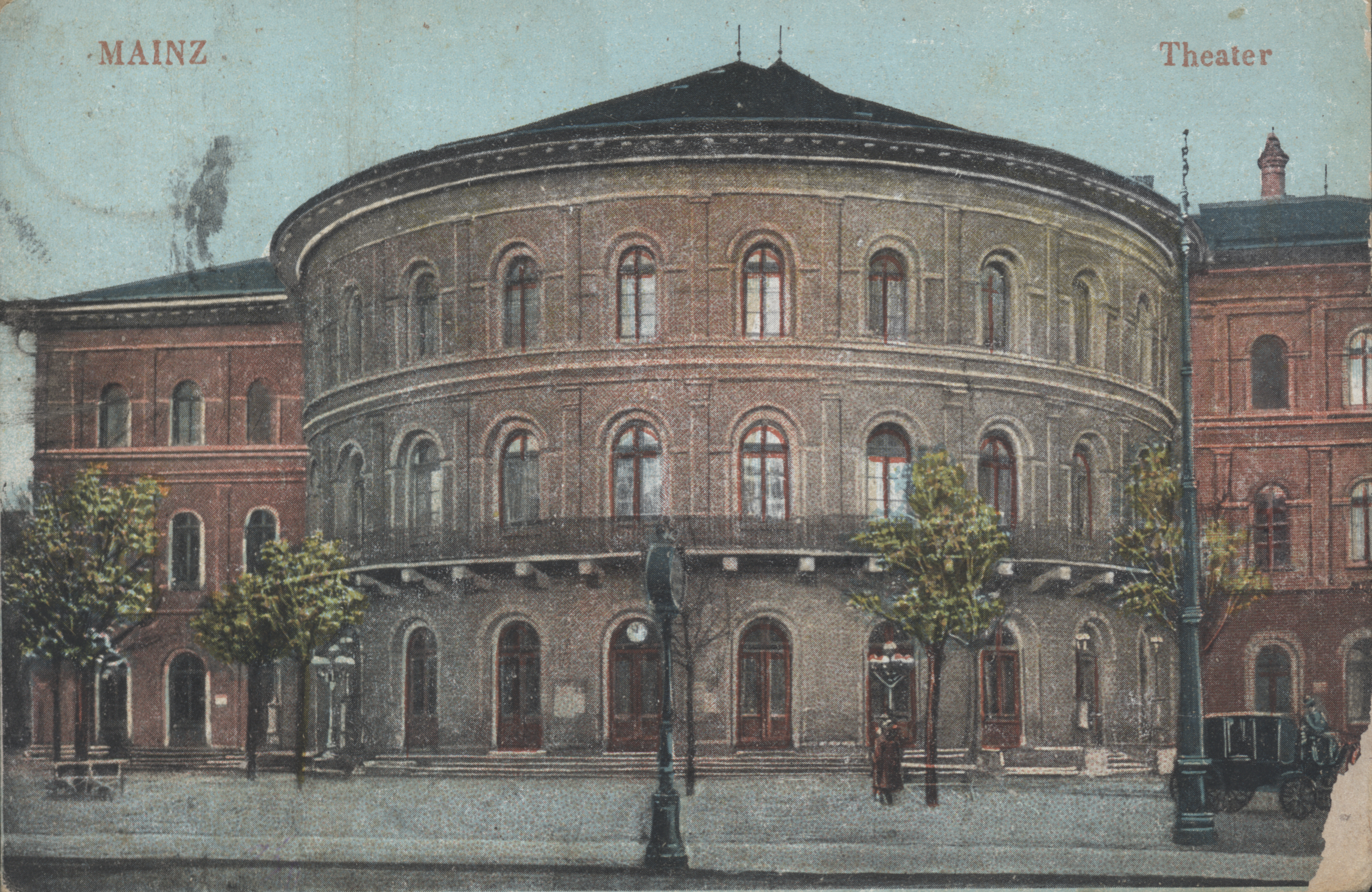
Staatstheater Mainz

== Literature ==
- Reinhard Wegner (1994). "Moller, Georg". Neue Deutsche Biographie (in German). Vol. 17. Berlin: Duncker & Humblot. pp. 742–744.
- Bernd Krimmel: Darmstadt in der Zeit des Klassizismus und der Romantik. Hess. Staatsarchiv Darmstadt, 1979
- Eckhart G. Franz: Georg Moller. Hess. Staatsarchiv Darmstadt
- Gilman, D. C.; Peck, H. T.; Colby, F. M., eds. (1905). "Moller, Georg" . New International Encyclopedia (1st ed.). New York: Dodd, Mead.
