= Hessische Staatskanzlei =

Hessian State Chancellery
- Hessische Staatskanzlei (German)
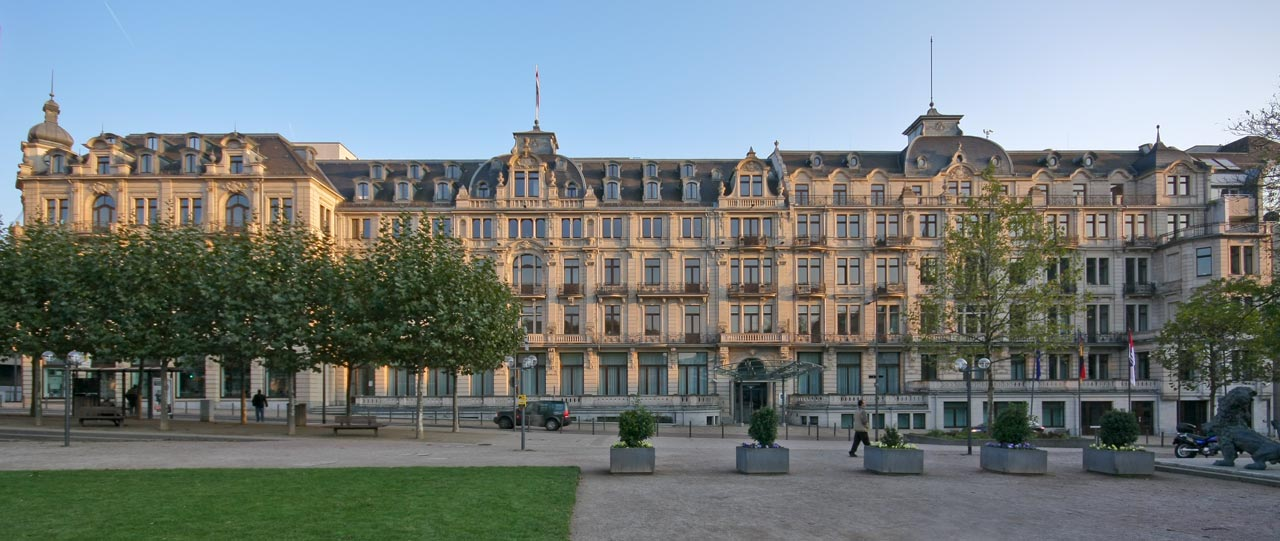
- View from NW
- Interactive map of the Hessian State Chancellery area

General information
- Location: Georg-August-Zinn-Str. 1, Wiesbaden, Germany
- Coordinates: 50°05′10″N 08°14′35″E
- Owner: Hesse State government

Website
- staatskanzlei.hessen.de

Hessische Staatskanzlei (the Hessian State Chancellery) is located in the Mitte borough of Wiesbaden, Hesse, Germany, opposite Kochbrunnenplatz. The former Grand Hotel Rose, representative of the Wilhelminian period in which it was constructed, is the seat of the government of the State of Hesse. The cabinet meetings of the state government also take place there. The acting head of the Hessian State Chancellery has been Axel Wintermeyer since August 31, 2010.

The State Chancellery also houses the Hessian Minister for Federal and European Affairs, to which the Hessian State Representation in Berlin belongs.

== Function ==
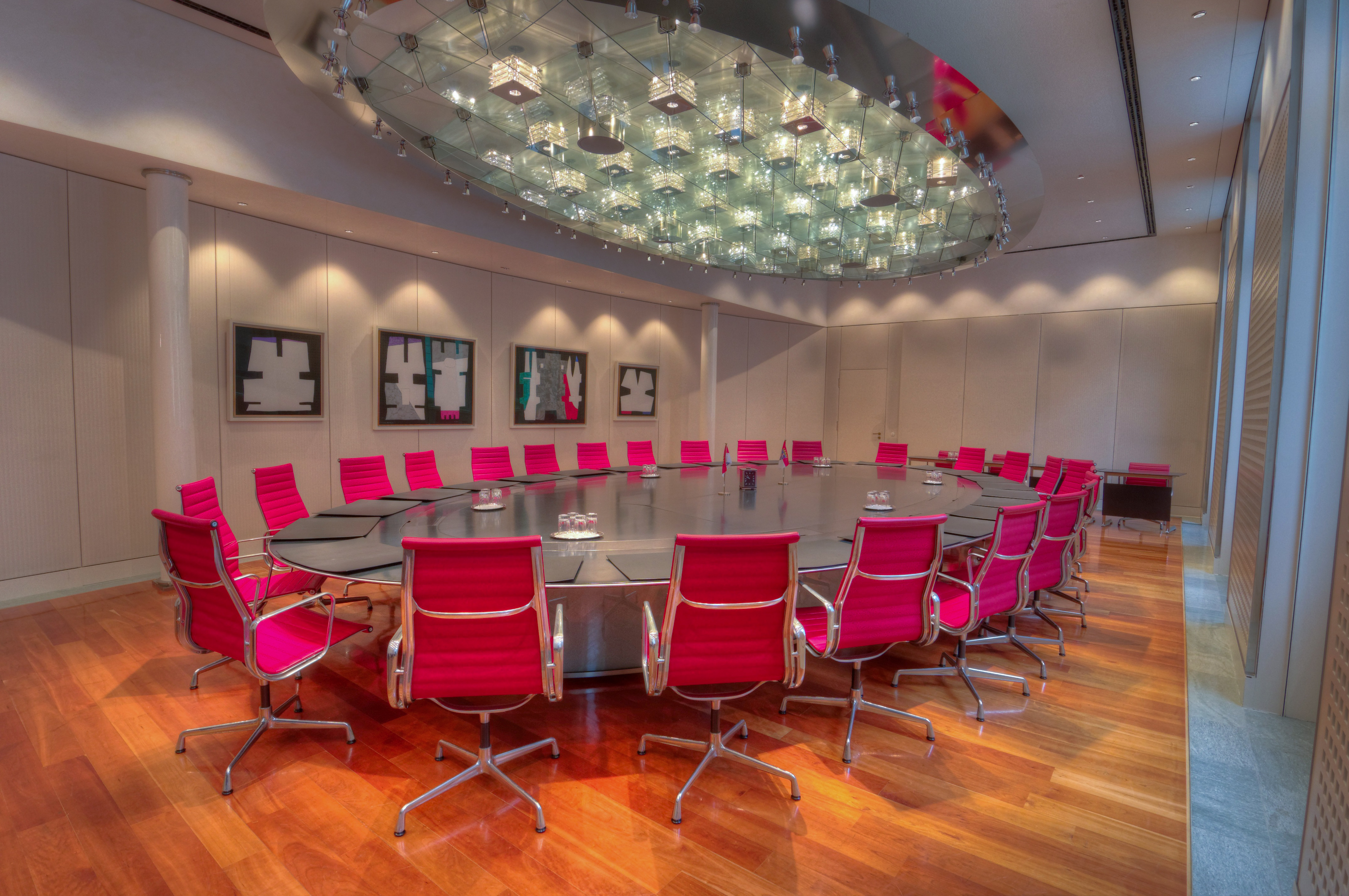
The cabinet room in 2013

It is from within the State Chancellery that the policy of the state government is drawn up and work between the various state ministries is coordinated. It is here that execution of the resolutions of the Landtag of Hesse and the issuance of laws and legal ordinances are controlled, and state treaties and administrative agreements are prepared. It is also the official residence of the Minister president, Boris Rhein, who was elected to that office in May 2022. The chancellery building also includes a room in which the state president conducts meetings of the cabinet.

== History ==
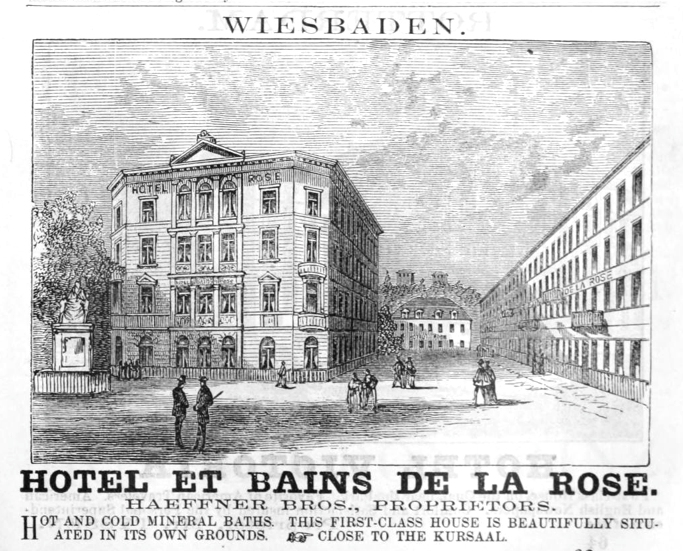
Grand Hotel Rose in 1885

The site had been used as a hotel since the sixteenth century, and by 1828 was one of the largest spas in Wiesbaden. In 1872–73, its owners, the Haeffner brothers, built the four-storey "Neue Rose" on Kranzplatz, and by 1904 additional buildings were added to form the Grand Hotel Rose, which extended to Taunusstraße. The enlarged hotel had 200 bedrooms in Louis XVI style, with a spa which had its own inflow from the Kochbrunnen hot spring. In the courtyard there was a large indoor tennis court.

From 1940 to 1944, the French delegation to the Franco-German Armistice Commission stayed in the hotel. In March 1945, the US Army occupation forces confiscated the building to use as accommodation, returning it to a relative of its former owners in 1958.

In 1959, after renovation, it was again operated as a hotel, but with fewer beds. Instead, 75 apartments were rented to permanent residents.

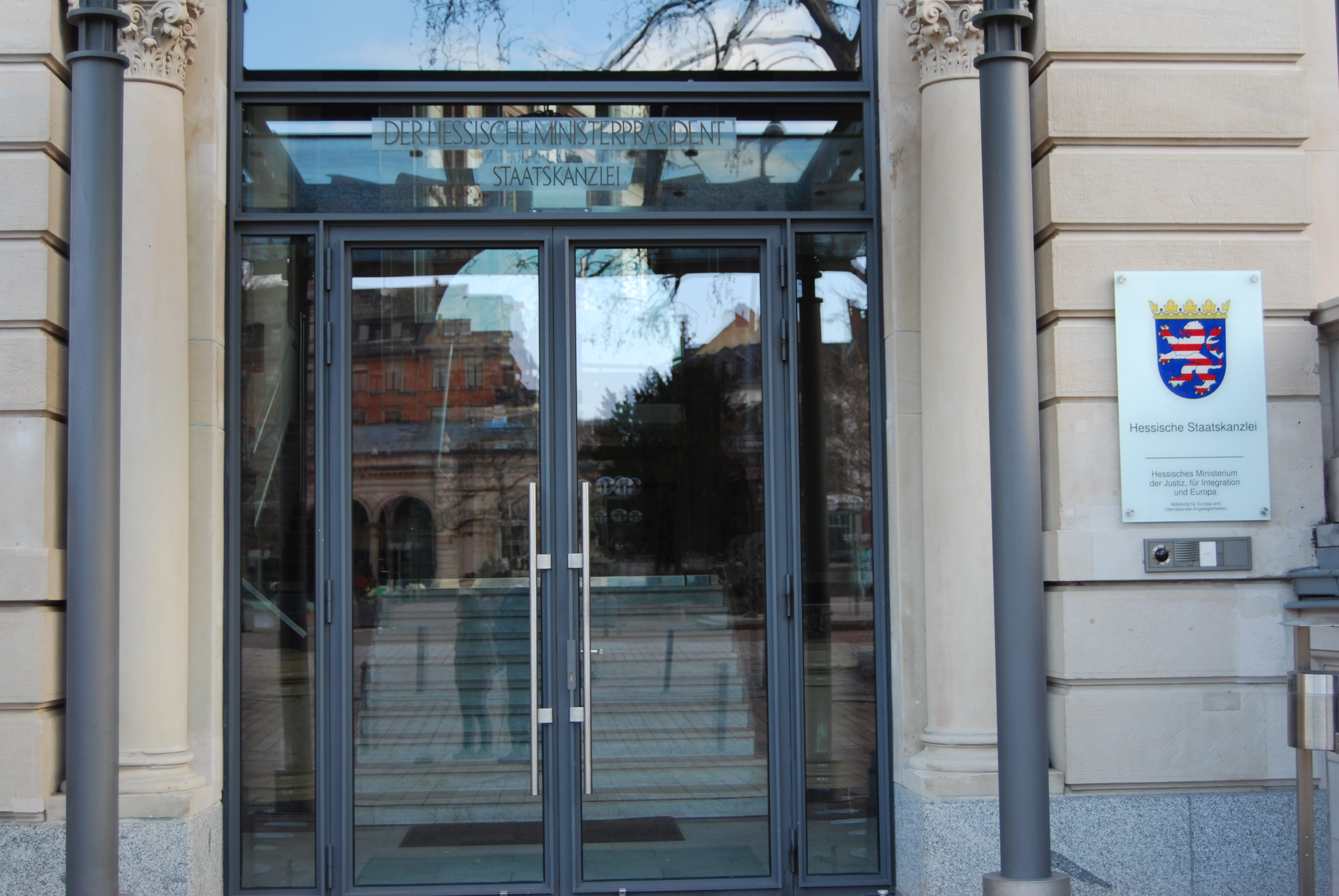
Main entrance in 2010

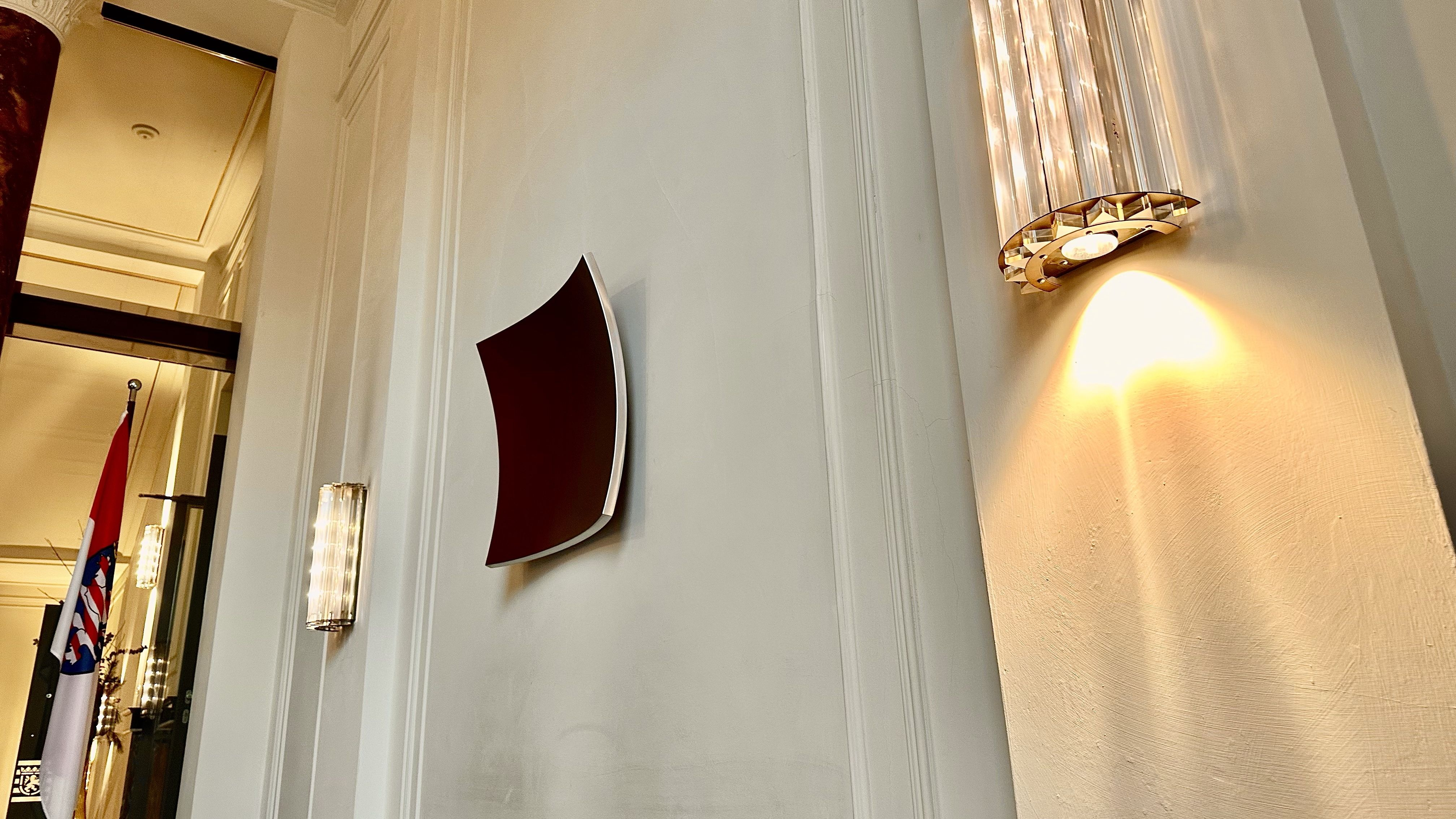
Artwork of Heiner Thiel, 2022, at the Foyer of the hessische Staatskanzlei

The building, which real estate entrepreneur Jürgen Schneider acquired in the early 1990s to turn it into a luxury hotel again, stood empty for years after the "Schneider affair" in 1994: after a billion-euro bankruptcy in 1994, Schneider was arrested in 1995 and sentenced to six years and nine months in prison for fraud, loan fraud and forgery of documents. He was released on parole in 1999.

Until 2004, the State Chancellery was spread over several buildings in Wiesbaden, which directly bordered the Warmer Damm park. Shortly after the turn of the millennium, the state acquired the former Hotel Rose on Kranzplatz to refurbish it for the State Chancellery in accordance with historic preservation requirements. In the summer of 2004, a branch office of the Hessian State Statistical Office and the State Center for Political Education, both of which are departments of the State Chancellery, moved in. As of 2023, about 440 employees work in the building.
