= Schloßplatz (Wiesbaden) =

Square in Wiesbaden, Germany

Coordinates: 50.0819°N 8.2414°E

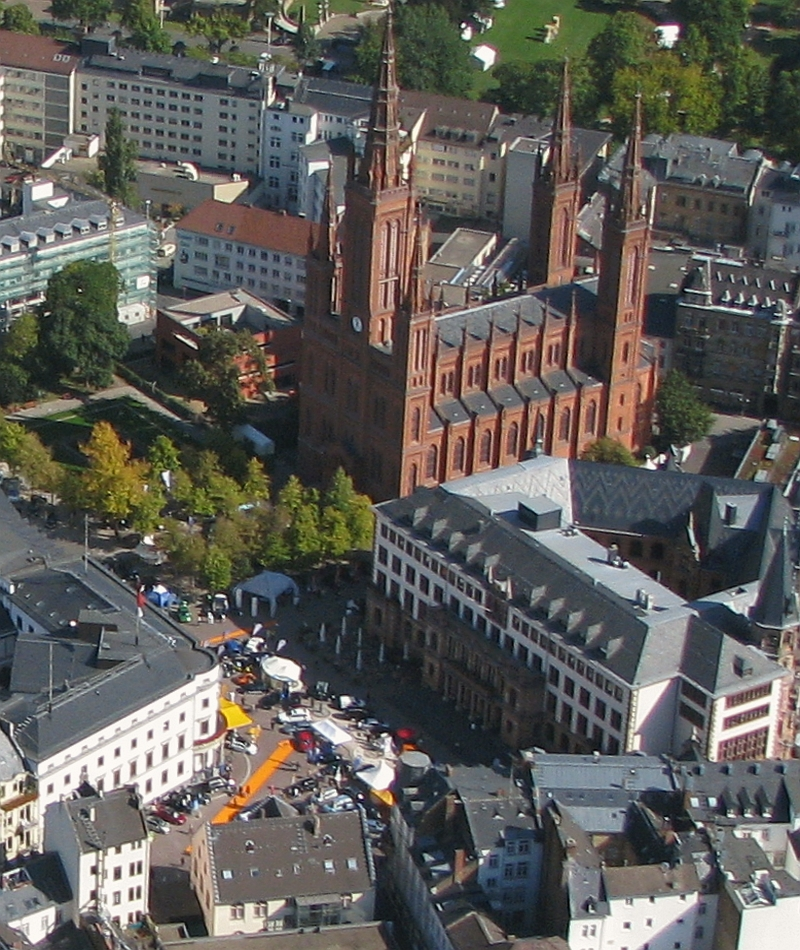
Aerial photo of the Schloßplatz in Wiesbaden with the Stadtschloss (left) and the New Town Hall (right)

The Schlossplatz (German pronunciation: [ˈʃlɔsˌplats], "Palace Square" or "Castle Square") forms the center of the historic Old Town of Wiesbaden, Hesse, Germany. It gets its name from the Stadtschloss, the royal residence of the Dukes of Nassau located on the north side of the square. Other buildings surrounding the Schlossplatz include the Old City Hall, the New Town Hall and the Marktkirche. In the middle of the square stands the Marktbrunnen (Market Well) of 1753. Due to this unique building ensemble, and the fact that at this point medieval Wiesbaden originated, it is historically the most important part of the city. Occasionally it is referred to as the "market square", its name before the palace was built.

The Schloßplatz was officially written as a proper noun using the letter 'ß' in the old German orthography. However, it was also correct to spell the word in new orthography as "Schlossplatz", which it often is.

== Literature ==
- Baedeker Wiesbaden Rheingau, Karl Baedeker GmbH, Ostfildern-Kemnat, 2001, ISBN 3879540764
- Gottfried Kiesow: Das verkannte Jahrhundert. Der Historismus am Beispiel Wiesbaden. Deutsche Stiftung Denkmalschutz, 2005, ISBN 3936942536
- Peter Schabe: Felix Genzmer – Stadtbaumeister des Historismus in Wiesbaden, Historische Kommission für Nassau, 1996
