= New Town Hall, Wiesbaden =

Coordinates: 50°4′55″N 8°14′31″E

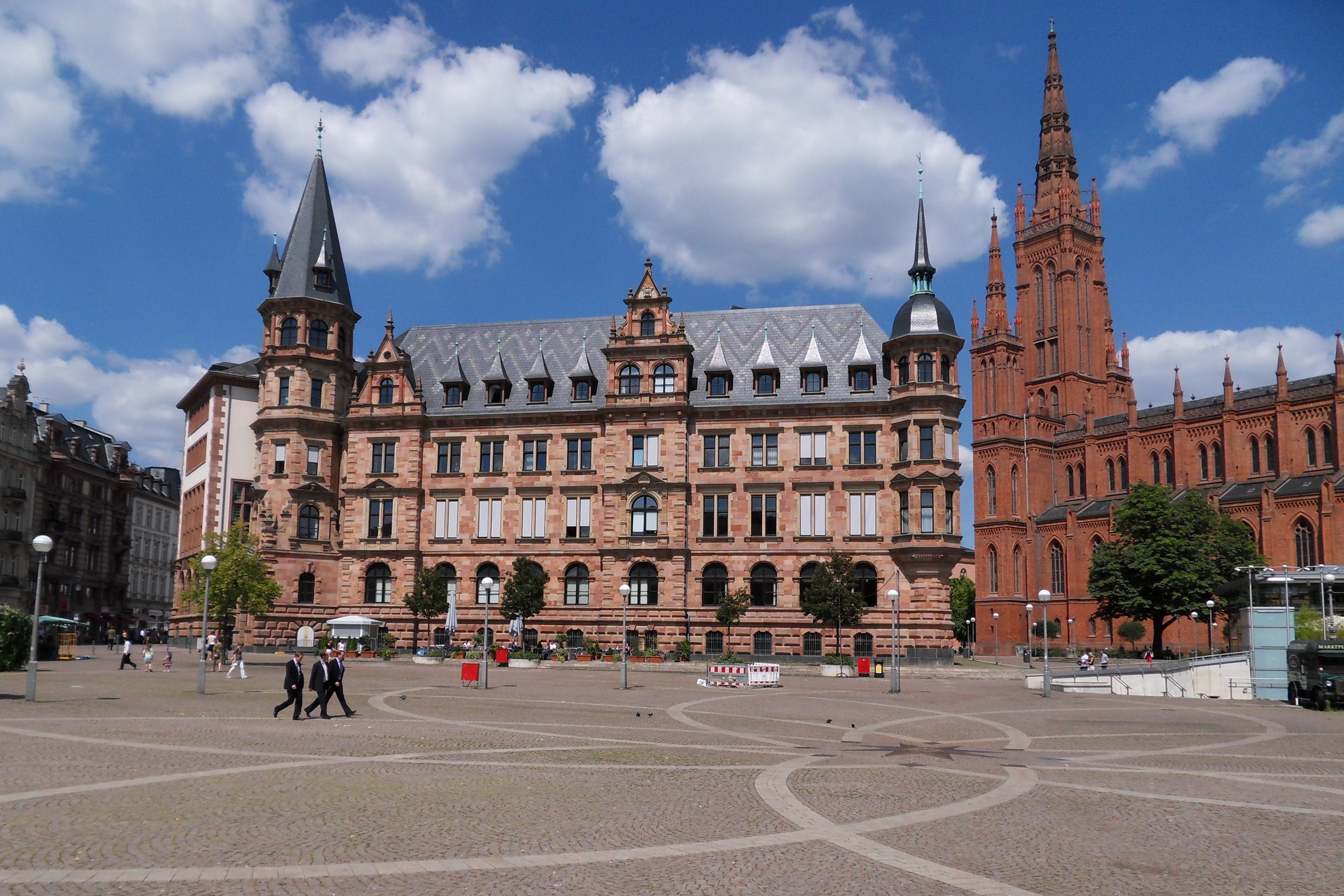
New Town Hall (left) and Marktkirche (right)

The New Town Hall (German: Neues Rathaus) is a town hall on the Schlossplatz in Wiesbaden, Hesse, Germany. It hosts the city government including the city council, offices of the mayors and part of the administration. It was built between 1884 and 1887 by Georg von Hauberrisser in a Renaissance Revival architecture style. The basement is almost completely occupied by a restaurant called Ratskeller.

== See also ==
- Stadtschloss, Wiesbaden
