= Belgitude =

Idea of Belgian Culture

National flag of Belgium

Belgitude (French pronunciation: [bɛlʒityd]; lit. 'Belgianness') is a term used loosely to express the typical Belgian soul and identity, often with a so-called keen sense of self-mockery that characterises its population. Originating from a perceived lack of common identity among the different communities, regions and language areas of Belgium, the neologism was coined in the 1970s and 1980s by allusion to the concept of négritude about feeling black, expressed among others by Léopold Sédar Senghor. It has since gained in popularity and has primarily been used to describe typical or unique aspects of Belgian culture.

== Context ==
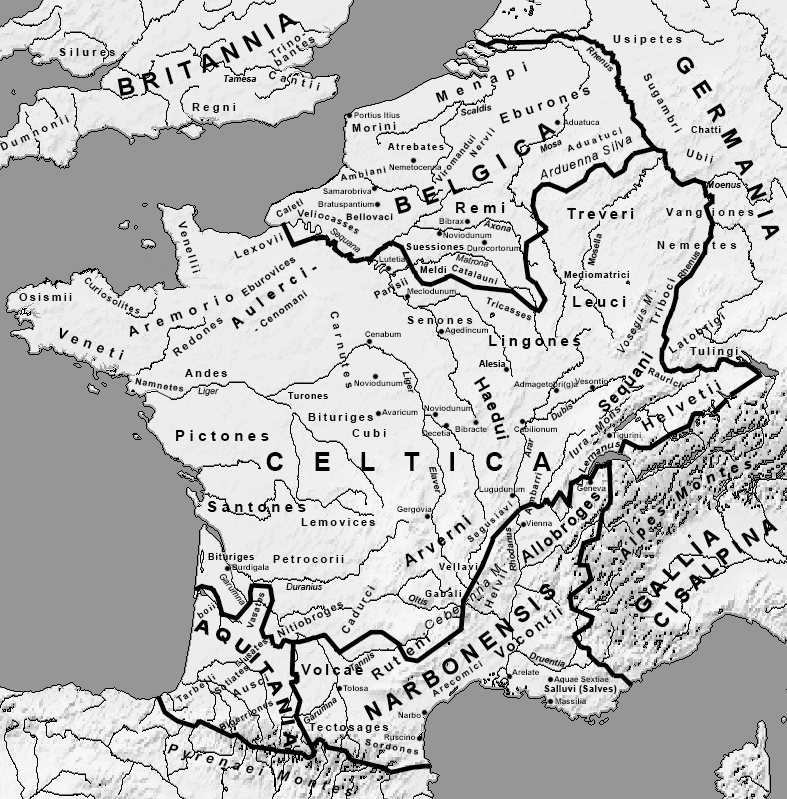
Gallia Belgica at the time of Julius Caesar's conquest of Gaul in 54 BCE

Contrary to most other countries, Belgians have a mixed feeling towards their identity as one people. This is a result of being occupied by many foreign European powers throughout the centuries, which led to somewhat of an inferiority complex about their status and power in the world. The regions known today as Belgium were conquered by Romans, Franks, Burgundy, Spain, Austria, the French and finally the Netherlands before becoming independent in 1830. Even then, they were occupied again by German forces during World War I and World War II. Because of that, the foreign rulers who reigned over the Belgian provinces were often appropriated by later historians to make them into national heroes: Godfrey of Bouillon, Charlemagne, Philippe the Good, Charles V, etc., whilst these characters were unaware of the very notion of the entity of Belgium.

Another aspect contributing to belgitude is the fact that many Belgians identify more with being Flemish, Walloon or inhabitant of Brussels, but even within those groups many feel more attached to being part of a city or province than any national or communal identity. Politically the country was once polarised on matters of religion and, in recent decades, it has faced new divisions over differences of language and unequal economic development. This ongoing antagonism has caused far-reaching reforms since the 1970s, changing the formerly unitary Belgian state into a federal state, and repeated governmental crises.

For all these reasons, the Belgian identity is seen as a "hollow" identity: it is defined mostly by what it is not. For example, the Belgian is neither French, Dutch or German. At the time of the term's coinage, it was not accepted by the general population, and the term seemed to have "more cultural than political weight". At the time, belgitude could be synonymous with marginality. Susan Bainbrigge defines it as "a term that represents [the] new approach to francophone Belgium specificity [that emerged] in the 1970s and 1980s". It involved the extent of the questioning identity of Belgians, often with a so-called keen sense of self-mockery that characterises them.

== History of the Belgian feeling of identity ==
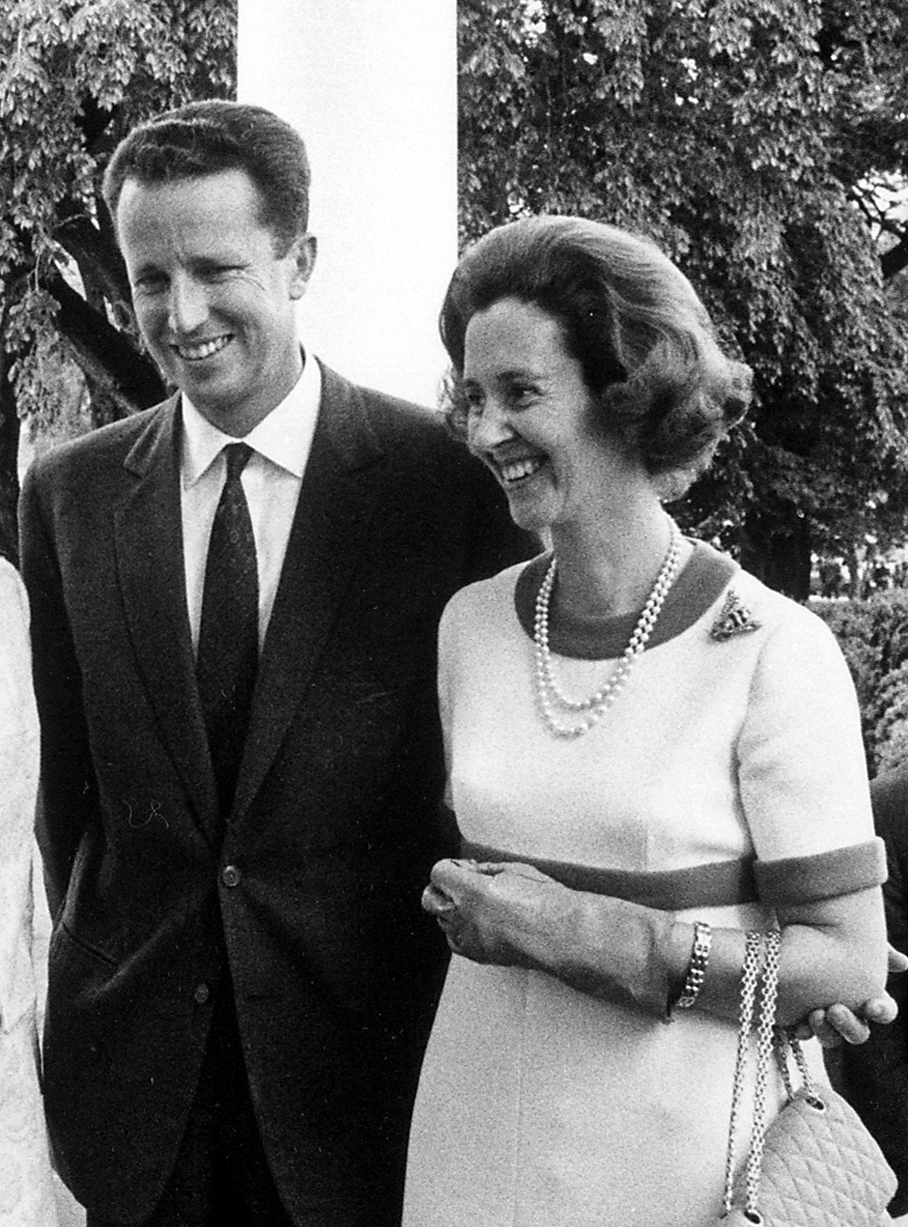
King Baudouin and Queen Fabiola are symbols of Belgium before it became a federal state in 1993. Baudouin died the same year the law came into effect, further symbolising his belgitude status.

During his conquest of Gaul in 54 BCE, Julius Caesar wrote in his Commentarii de Bello Gallico about the three Celtic tribes that inhabited the country, namely the Aquitani in the southwest, the Gauls of the biggest central part, who in their own language were called Celtae, and the Belgae in the north. Caesar famously wrote that the Belgae were "the bravest of the three peoples, being farthest removed from the highly developed civilization of the Roman Province, least often visited by merchants with enervating luxuries for sale, and nearest to the Germans across the Rhine, with whom they are continually at war". Despite Caesar referring to the Celtic tribe the Belgae and not modern day Belgium the quote was used a lot in Belgian history books from the 1830s on while the new independent state searched for its own identity.

The most famous quote about the Belgian identity was said by the Walloon socialist politician Jules Destrée. According to Destrée, Belgium was composed of two separate entities, Flanders and Wallonia, and a feeling of Belgian nationalism was not possible, illustrated in his 1906 work An idea that is dying: the fatherland. In the Revue de Belgique of 15 August 1912, he articulated this in his famous and notorious Letter to the king on the separation of Wallonia and Flanders, where he wrote: In Belgium there are Walloons and Flemings. There are no Belgians.

Contrary to later interpretations, Destrée did not favor separatism, but wanted a move to a federal state. King Albert I of Belgium wrote an official answer to the letter, which read: "I read the letter of Destrée, which, without uncertainty, is some literature of great talent. All that he said is absolutely true, but it is not less true that administrative separation would be an evil with more disadvantages and dangers than any aspect of the current situation." In 1960, Flemish politician Gaston Eyskens modified this quote, saying Sire, there are no more Belgians, after the first steps were taken to transform Belgium into a federal state.

== Etymology ==
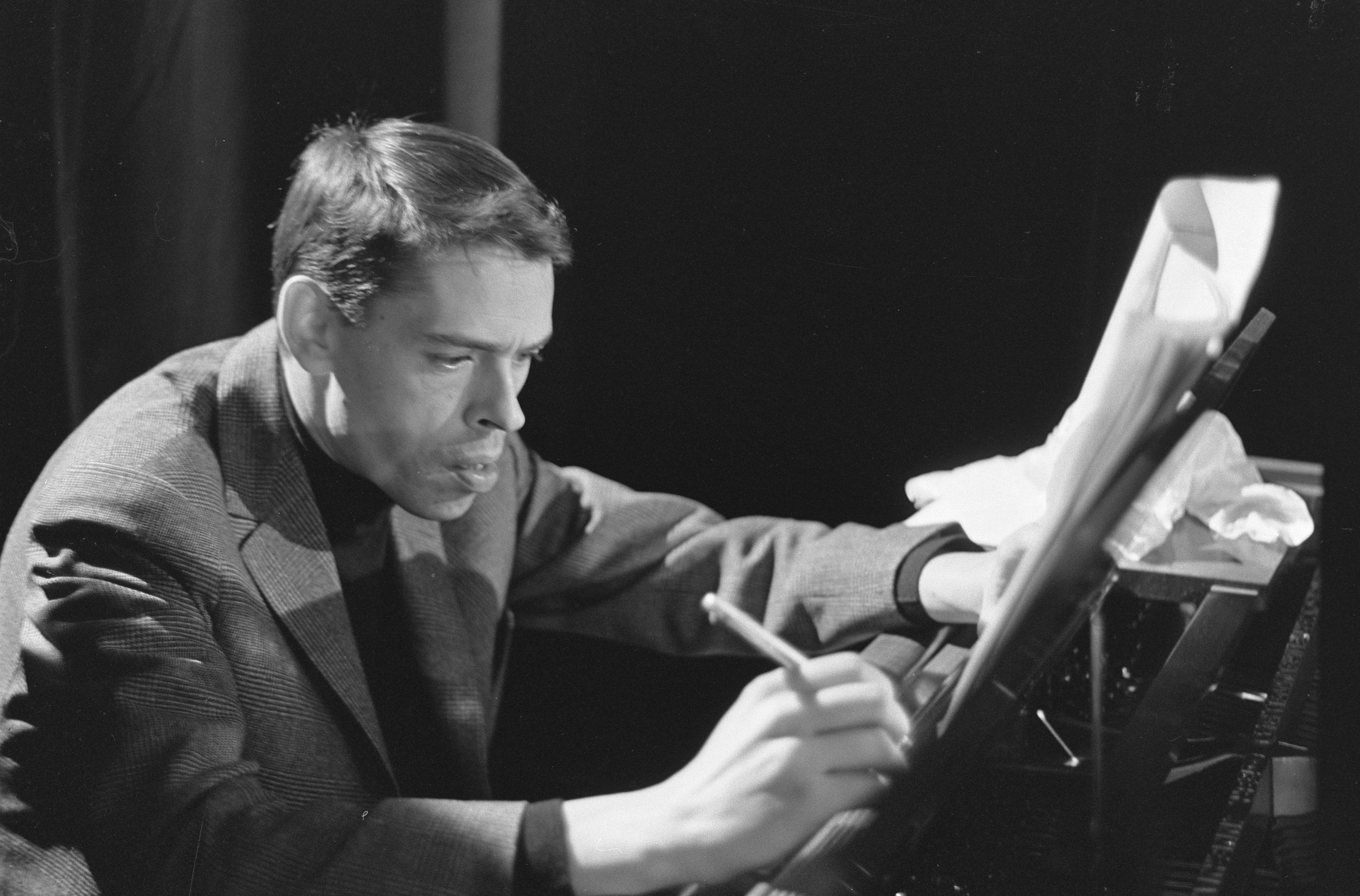
Singer-songwriter Jacques Brel is an example of belgitude due to his international fame and the fact he was raised perfectly bilingual.

The neologism belgitude was coined in 1976, by Pierre Mertens and Claude Jevaeu, in an issue of the Nouvelles littéraires called "L'autre Belgique". It alludes to the term négritude about feeling black, expressed among others by the Senegalese poet, politician and cultural theorist Leopold Sedar Senghor. The term caught on quick enough to be referred to in Belgian singer Jacques Brel's song "Mai 1940" (May 1940), which was left off his final album Les Marquises in 1977, but made available in 2003. In the song, Brel refers to German soldiers who occupied Belgium during World War II and wiped out his belgitude:

D'un ciel plus bleu qu'à l'habitude (Translation: "With a heaven bluer than usual")

Ce mai 40 a salué (Translation: "That May 1940 greeted")

Quelques Allemands disciplinés (Translation: "Several disciplined Germans")

Qui écrasaient ma belgitude (Translation: "Crushing out my belgitude".)

In 2011, the word belgitude was listed in the French encyclopedic dictionary the Petit Larousse, and one year later, in the Robert.

== Examples of belgitude ==
Belgitude is primarily characterised today by subject matters and symbols that are typical or unique to Belgian culture, such as Belgian Dutch and Belgian French. The Dutch in Belgium has many gallicisms and the French in Belgium many hollandisms, both in terms of words as well as grammar. For instance, the word "plezant" ("amusing") in Flanders is derived from the French word "plaisant" and is hardly used in the Netherlands.

Typical foods and drinks, such as Belgian beer, moules-frites, speculoos, waterzooi, witloof, Brussels sprouts, and Belgian chocolate, to name a few, are seen as examples of belgitude, because they are often promoted abroad. People who were important to Belgian history are also often cited: Ambiorix, Godfrey of Bouillon, Charles V, Adolphe Sax, King Baudouin, as are cultural icons such as Manneken Pis, the Gilles of Binche, Pieter Bruegel the Elder, Peter Paul Rubens, Tintin, The Smurfs, Inspector Maigret, the Atomium, Jacques Brel, René Magritte, Soeur Sourire, Django Reinhardt, etc. In the fields of sport, Eddy Merckx and the Red Devils are good examples. The song "Potverdekke! (It's great to be a Belgian)" (1998) by Mr. John is also an expression of belgitude. The satirical comedy and film adaptation Sois Belge et tais-toi!, the films of Jan Bucquoy and the comedy team Les Snuls are all loving and mocking tributes to the Belgian identity.

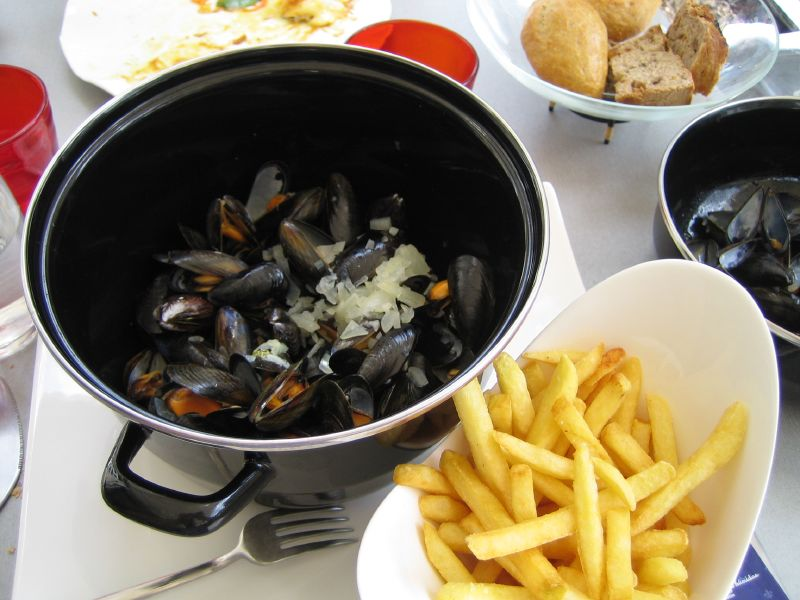
Moules-frites or mosselen met friet is a representative dish of Belgium.

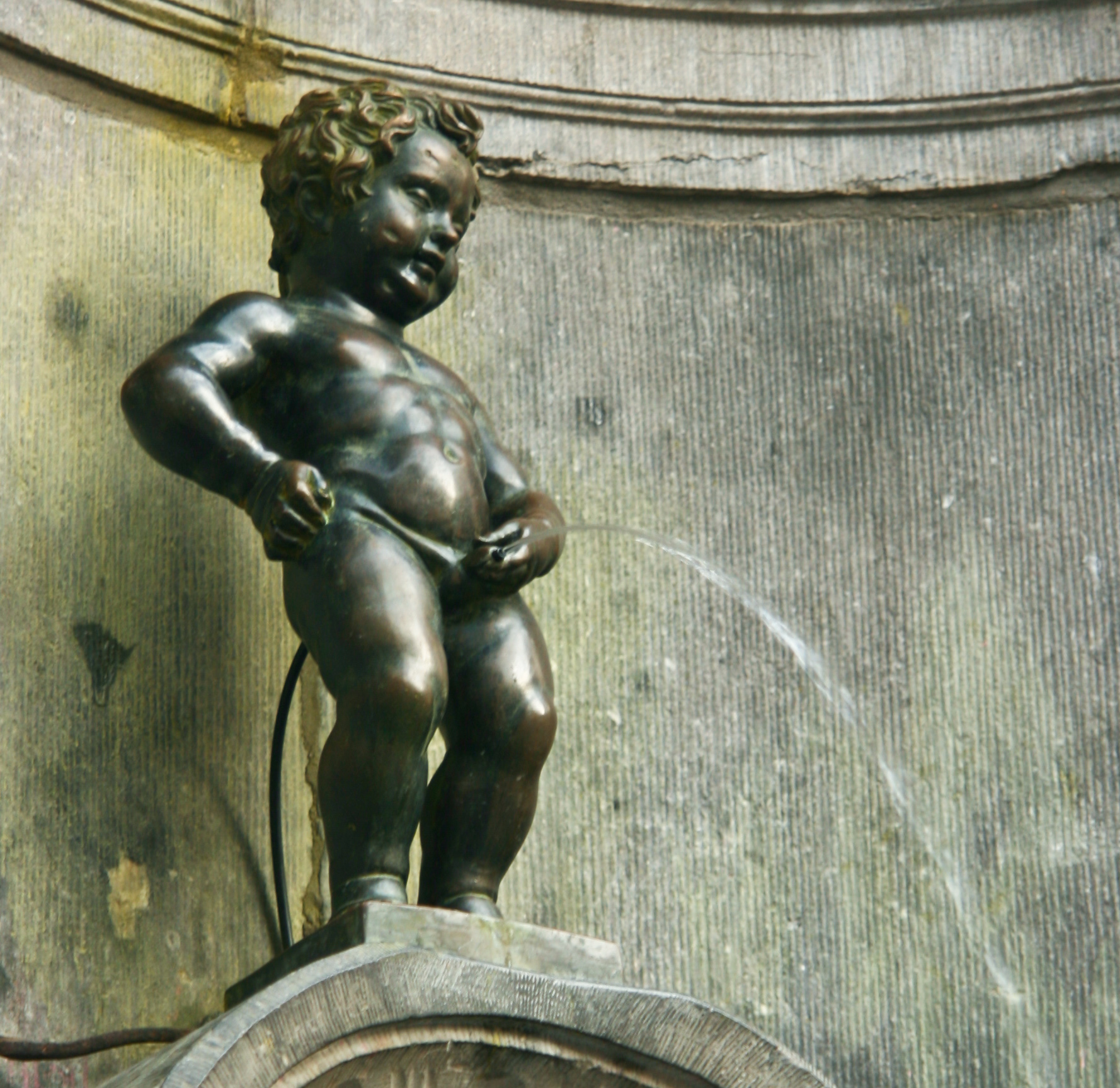
The statue of Manneken Pis in Brussels is an example of a cultural belgitude.

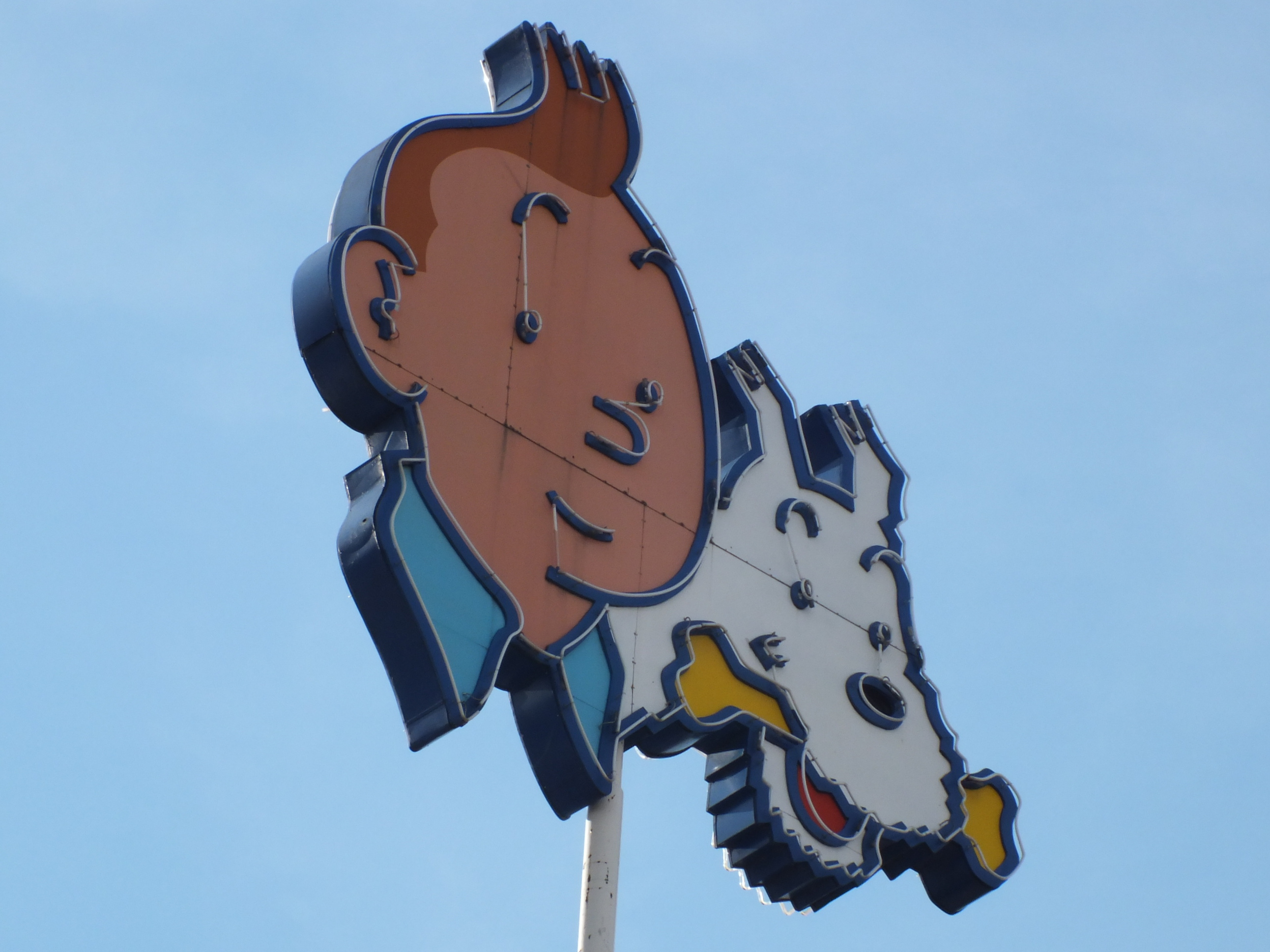
Tintin and Snowy are international cultural symbols of belgitude.

== See also ==
- Communities, regions and language areas of Belgium
- History of Belgium
- Languages of Belgium
