= Potverdekke! (It's great to be a Belgian) =

1998 novelty song recorded by British singer John Makin

"Potverdekke! (It's Great to Be a Belgian)"
- 1998 CD single cover

Single by Mister John
- Language: English
- B-side: "Anglais - Franglais"
- Released: 18 July 1998
- Length: 4:01
- Label: Pink Records
- Songwriter: John Makin

Mister John singles chronology
"Anglais - Franglais" (1981)	"Potverdekke! (It's Great to Be a Belgian)" (1998)

"Potverdekke! (It's great to be a Belgian)" is a 1998 novelty song, recorded by British singer John Makin, better known under his artist name, Mister John. It was his only hit song in his long career, making him a classic example of a one-hit wonder.

The word "Potverdekke" is a minced oath used in parts of Flanders; the intended meaning is "Goddamn!" (Dutch: godverdomme), but the roots for "God" and "damn" have been replaced by similar-sounding words.

== History ==
The song is a joyful celebration of Belgium. It was created by Makin and some of his Belgian friends as a throwaway joke, but to their surprise became a huge hit in Belgium, spending more than 26 weeks in the national hitparade. This was especially amazing, seeing that the hit charted while the Dutroux scandal was in full effect, and many Belgians at the time were not in the mood for national pride. Mr. John was even invited to perform it during the National Holiday on July 21, 1998, before king Albert II of Belgium.

The song also references the (then current) British mad cow disease in the line: "Now, the English egg and bacon is not so bad/ especially since all their cows went mad./ But if they never tasted mussels on the Grand-Place down in Brussels/ it's no wonder they're feeling very sad."

== Belgian icons listed in the song ==
All throughout the song Mister John names several iconic Belgian people, fictional characters, inventions, locations and brands. Among these are:

- mayonnaise and frites (a reference to Belgian fries and moules-frites)
- Duvel (a Belgian beer brand)
- the saxophone (invented by Belgian born Adolphe Sax)
- Tintin and Captain Haddock (characters from the internationally famous Belgian comics series The Adventures of Tintin.)
- Hercule Poirot (a Belgian private detective, invented by British author Agatha Christie, whose stories were based in the UK.)
- mussels (a reference to moules-frites)
- The Grand-Place of Brussels
- Kriek (a Belgian beer style)
- The Schelde and the Meuse (major rivers which run through Belgium)
- Gueuze (a beer produced by blending old and young lambic ales)
- Leffe, Chimay (Belgian beer brands)
- Lambiek (a Belgian beer style, typically known in English as lambic)

== See also ==
- Belgitude
