= Street fair =

Outdoor neighborhood fair

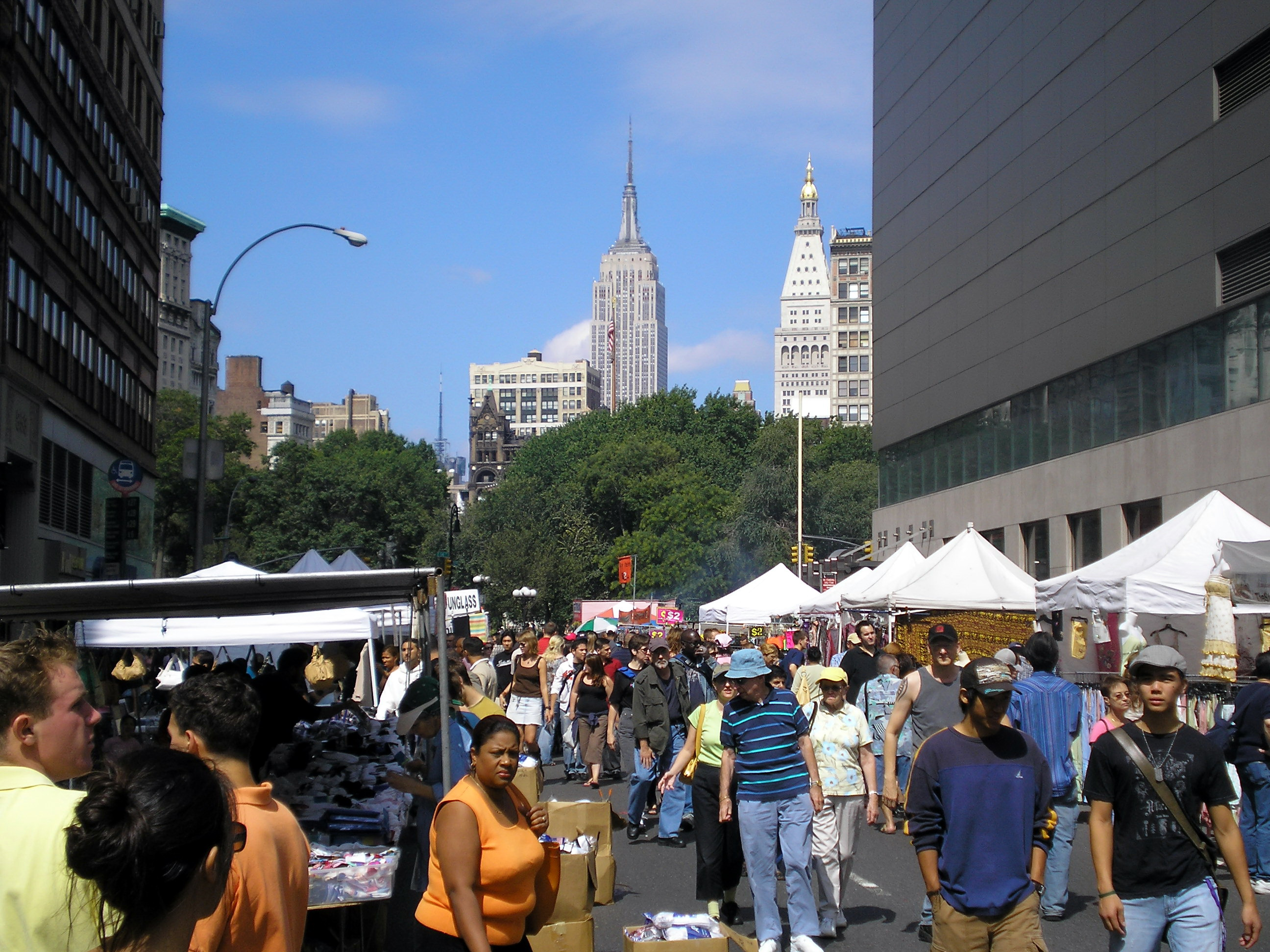
A street fair in New York City

A street fair celebrates the character of a neighborhood. As its name suggests, it is typically held on the main street of a neighborhood.

The principal component of street fairs are booths used to sell goods (particularly food) or convey information. Some include carnival rides and parades. Many have live music and dance demonstrations.

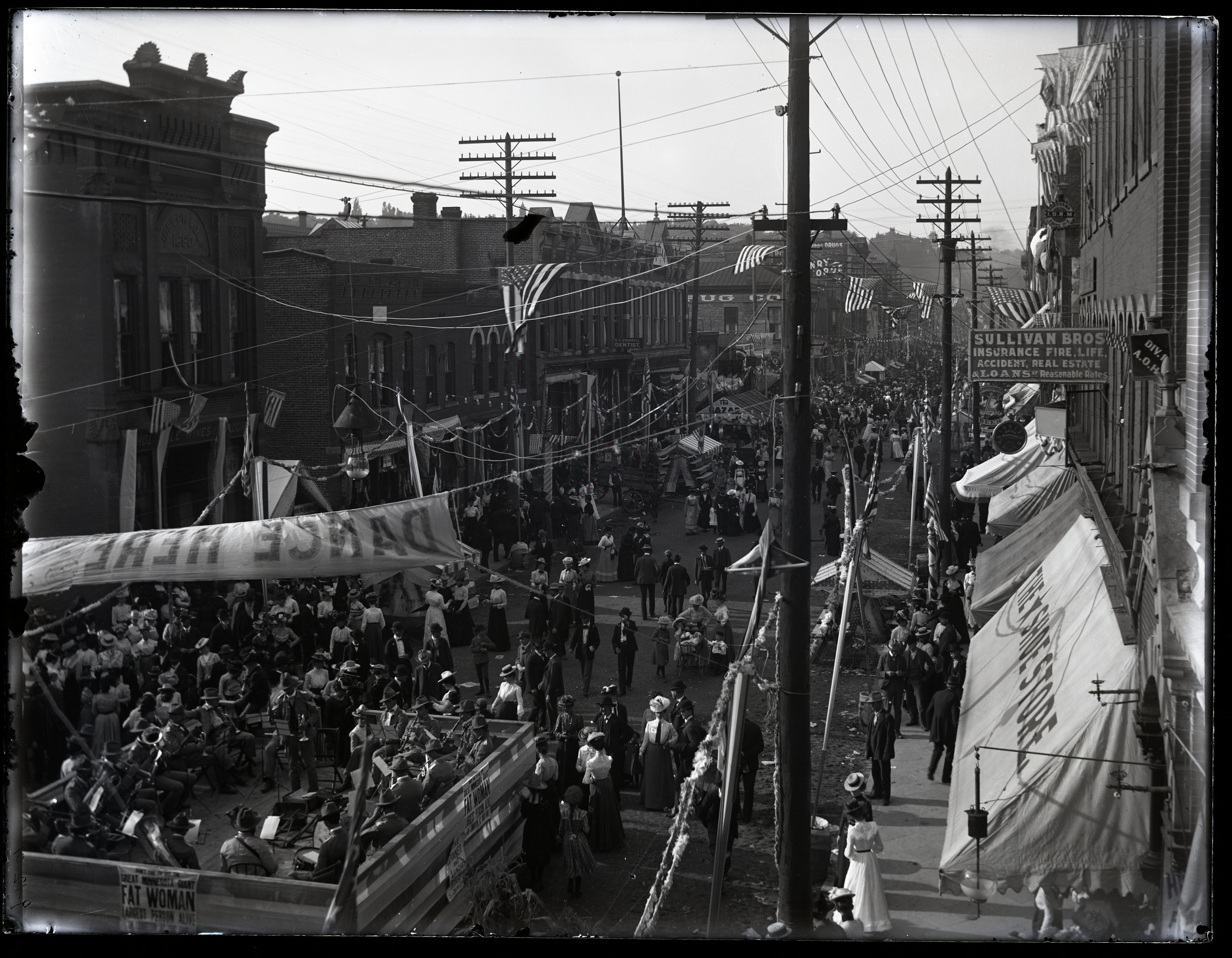
1901 street fair in Stillwater, Minnesota

Fairs typically range no more than a few blocks long, although some fairs, such as the 9th Avenue International Food Festival in New York City and the Solano Stroll in Northern California, extend more than a mile. A fair only one block long is commonly called a block party.

== Variety ==
Street fairs vary greatly in character, even within one city. Annual street fairs in Seattle, Washington, for example, include the University District Street Fair that feature the work of craftspeople and require that the person who make the goods that are for sale must be present in their own booths. The Fremont Fair features crafts from around the world, as well as the Summer Solstice Parade and Pageant, famed for its painted naked cyclists. In the same city, the Capitol Hill Block Party fences off several blocks, charges admission, and features some of the city's best known rock bands, while the Chinatown-International District Summer Fair has a distinctly Asian-American and Pacific Islander flavor, with taiko drummers, martial arts demonstrations and Hawaiian dance.

In Belgium, street fairs are known as braderies, which translates to roasting, referencing the frequent roasting of meat at the events.

=== Fan zones ===
Accompanying sporting events are street fairs known as fan zones. Examples include the Olympics, American football, motorsports and major association football events, particularly international tournament games.

==== Online ====
In recent years, the concept has expanded to include online fan zones, where fans of clubs and teams can engage digitally through live streaming, social media interaction, and virtual communities. Online fan zones exist on platforms that centralize fan engagement, for example supporting clubs like PSG, Barcelona, or national teams, and on platforms such as fanzone.world, which provide spaces for fans to follow events, interact, and comment in real time.

== List of street fairs ==
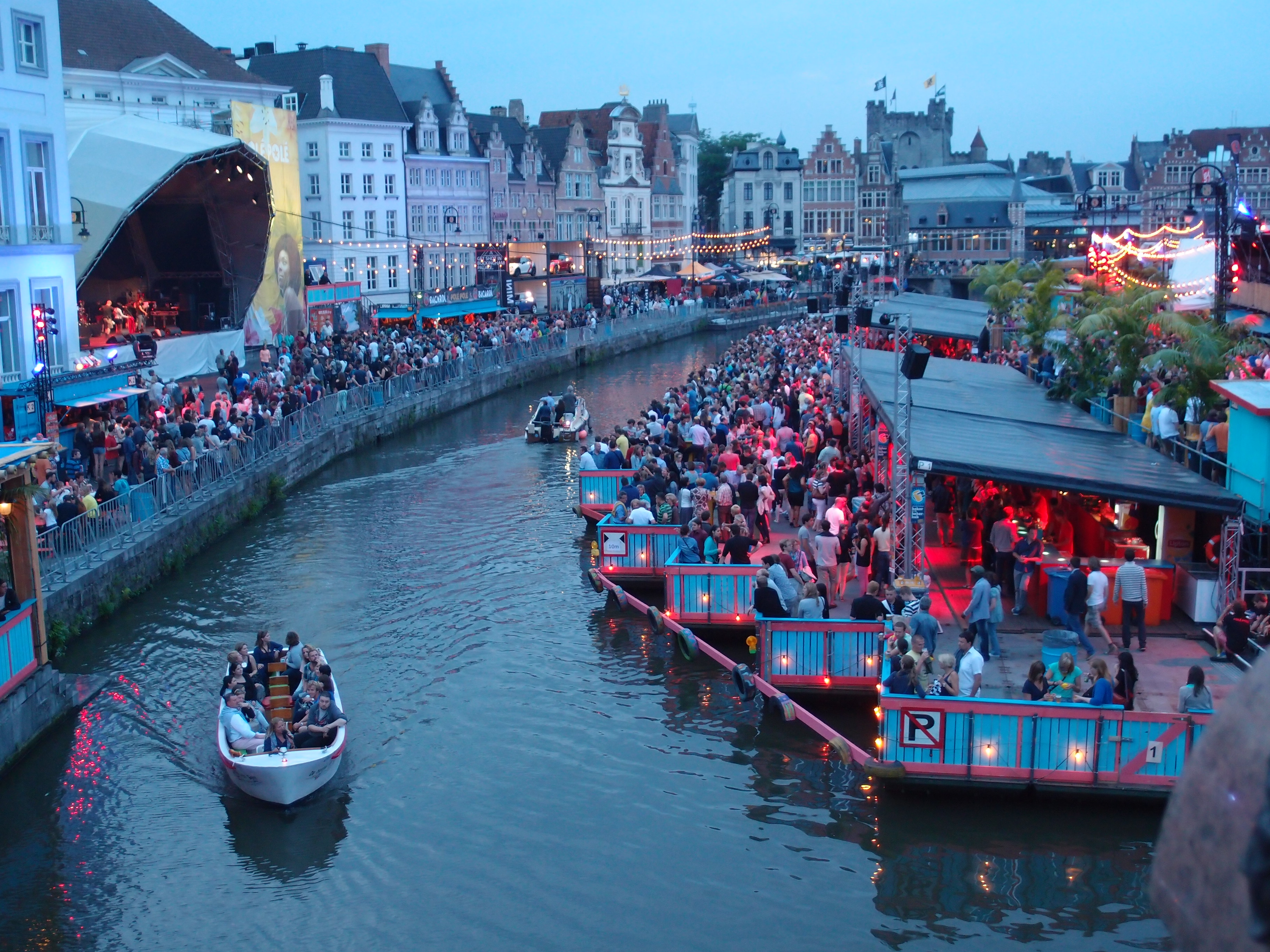
Gentse Feesten, 2014

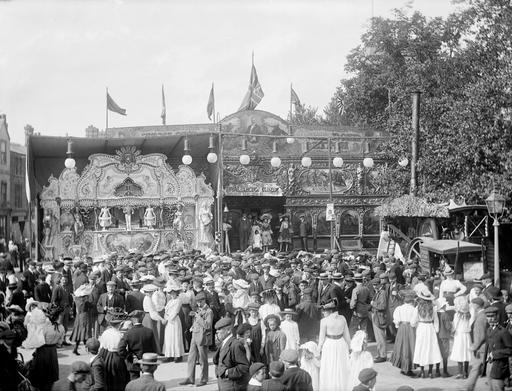
The St Giles' Fair in 1905, photographed by Henry Taunt

- Atlantic Antic
- Braderie de Lille
- Boishakhi Mela
- Castro Street Fair
- Chorley cake Street Fair
- Corn School
- Ephrata Fair
- Feast of San Gennaro
- Festa do Albariño
- Folsom Europe
- Folsom Street Fair
- Gentse Feesten
- Giglio Society of East Harlem
- Großheuriger in Austria
- How Weird Street Faire
- Kentucky Avenue Renaissance Festival
- Lesbian and Gay City Festival
- Lilac Festival (Calgary)
- Northalsted Market Days
- Solano Avenue Stroll
- St Crispin Street Fair
- St Giles' Fair
- Sunset Junction Street Fair
- Taste of Arlington
- Up Your Alley Fair
- Ohio Festival and Events Association lists Ohio fairs

== Gallery ==
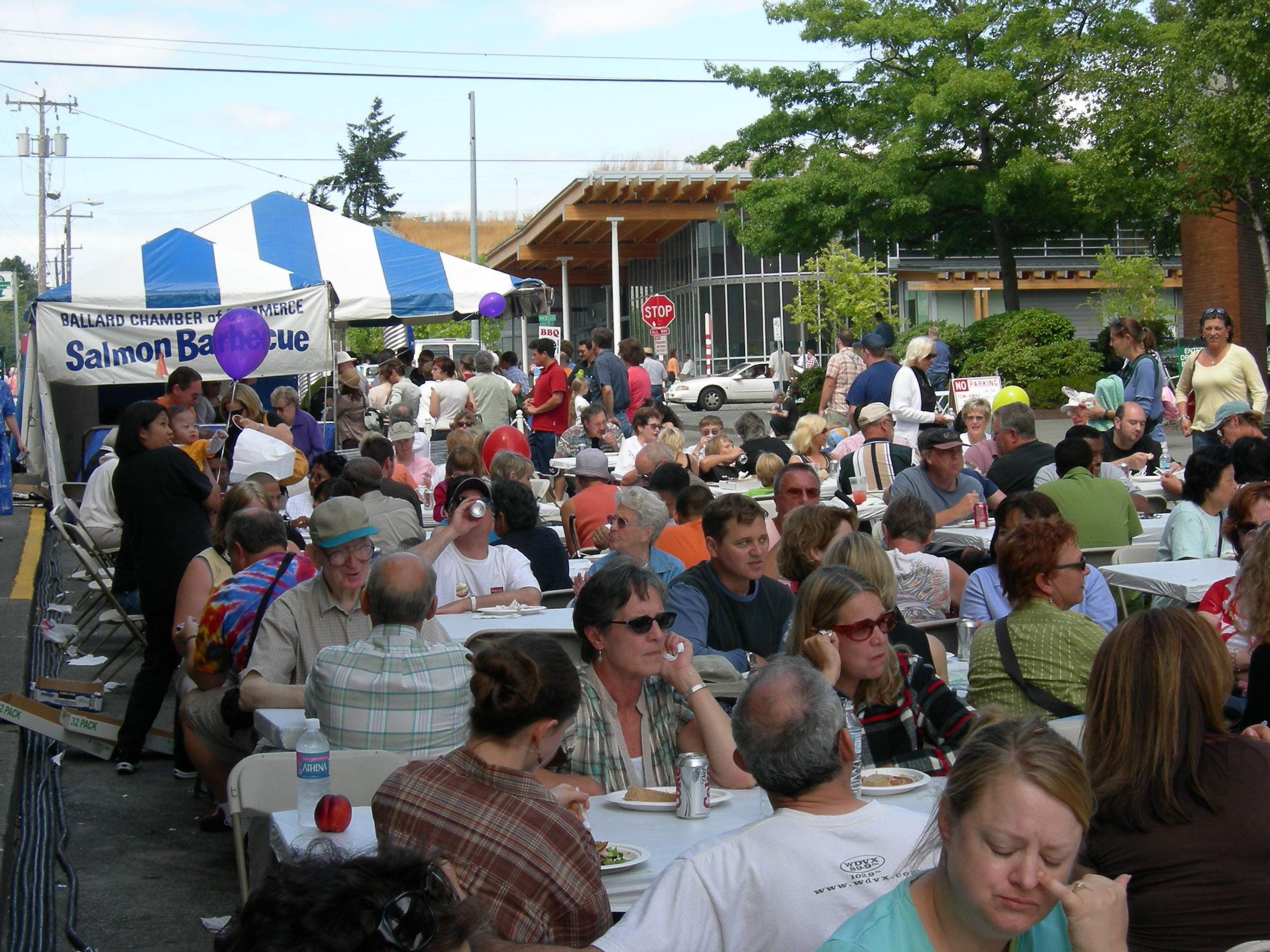
A street fair in the historically seafaring neighborhood of Ballard, Seattle, Washington

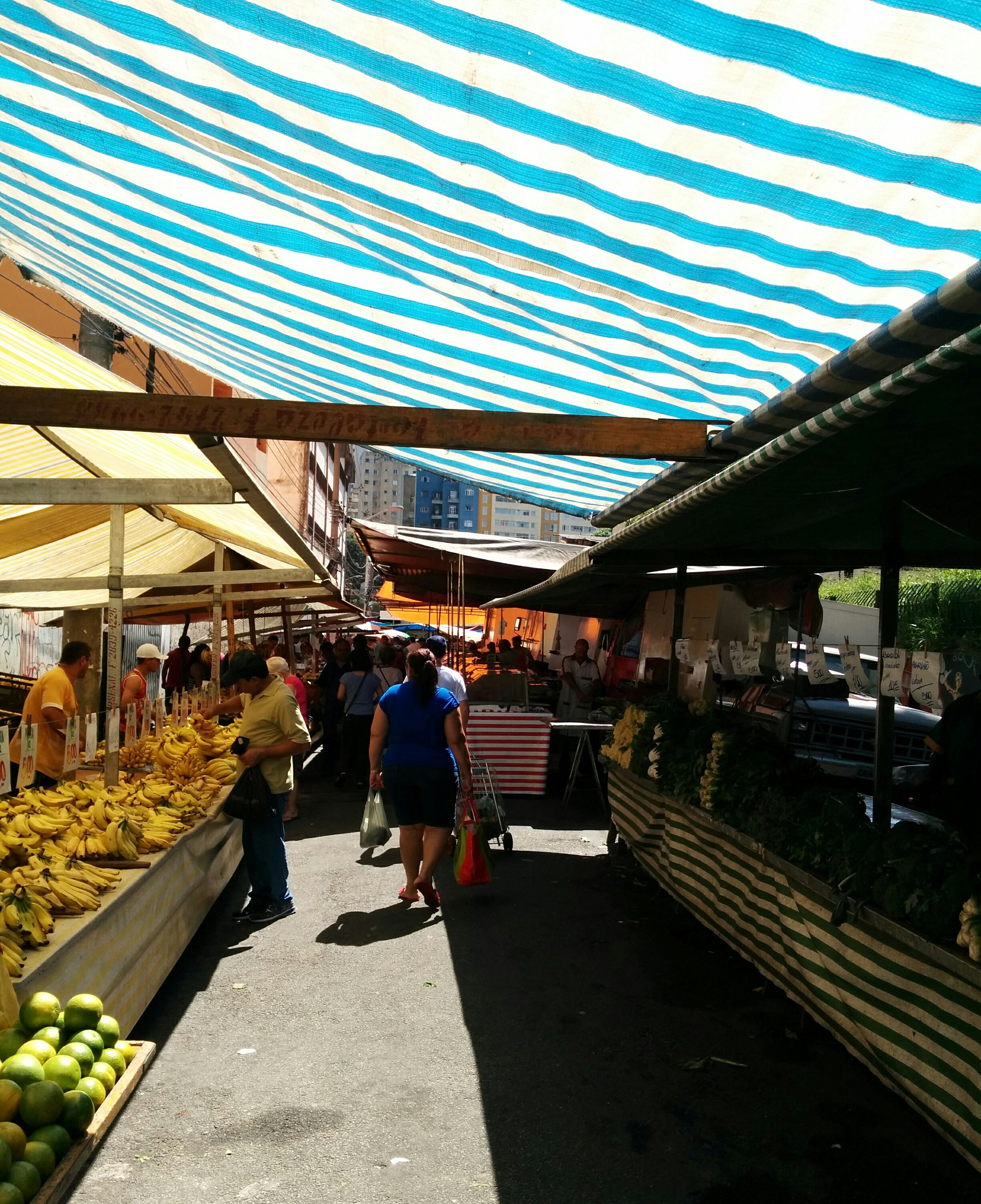
Produce at a street fair at São Paulo

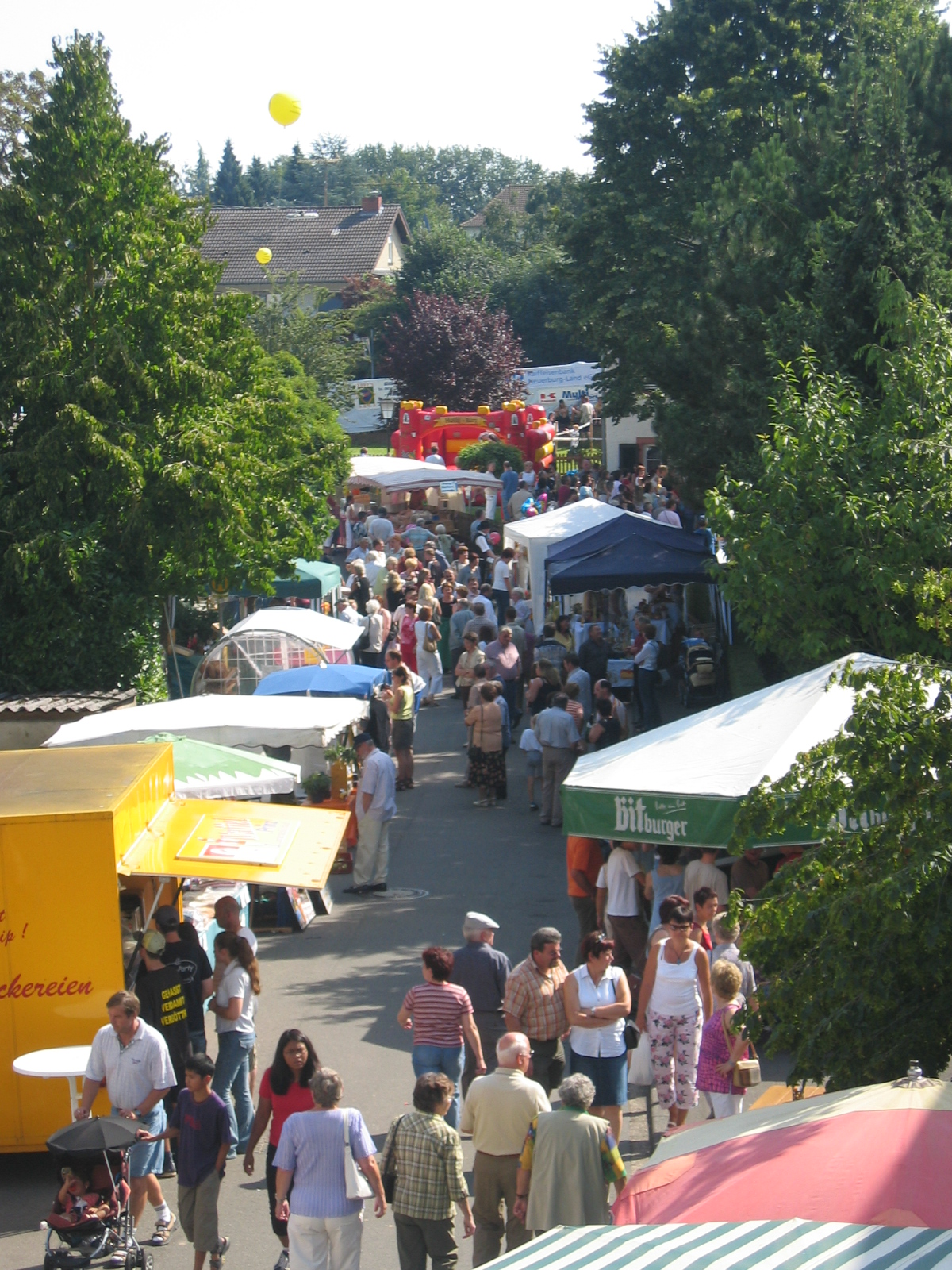
A view of the Quetschenfest street fair in the community of Geichlingen, Germany

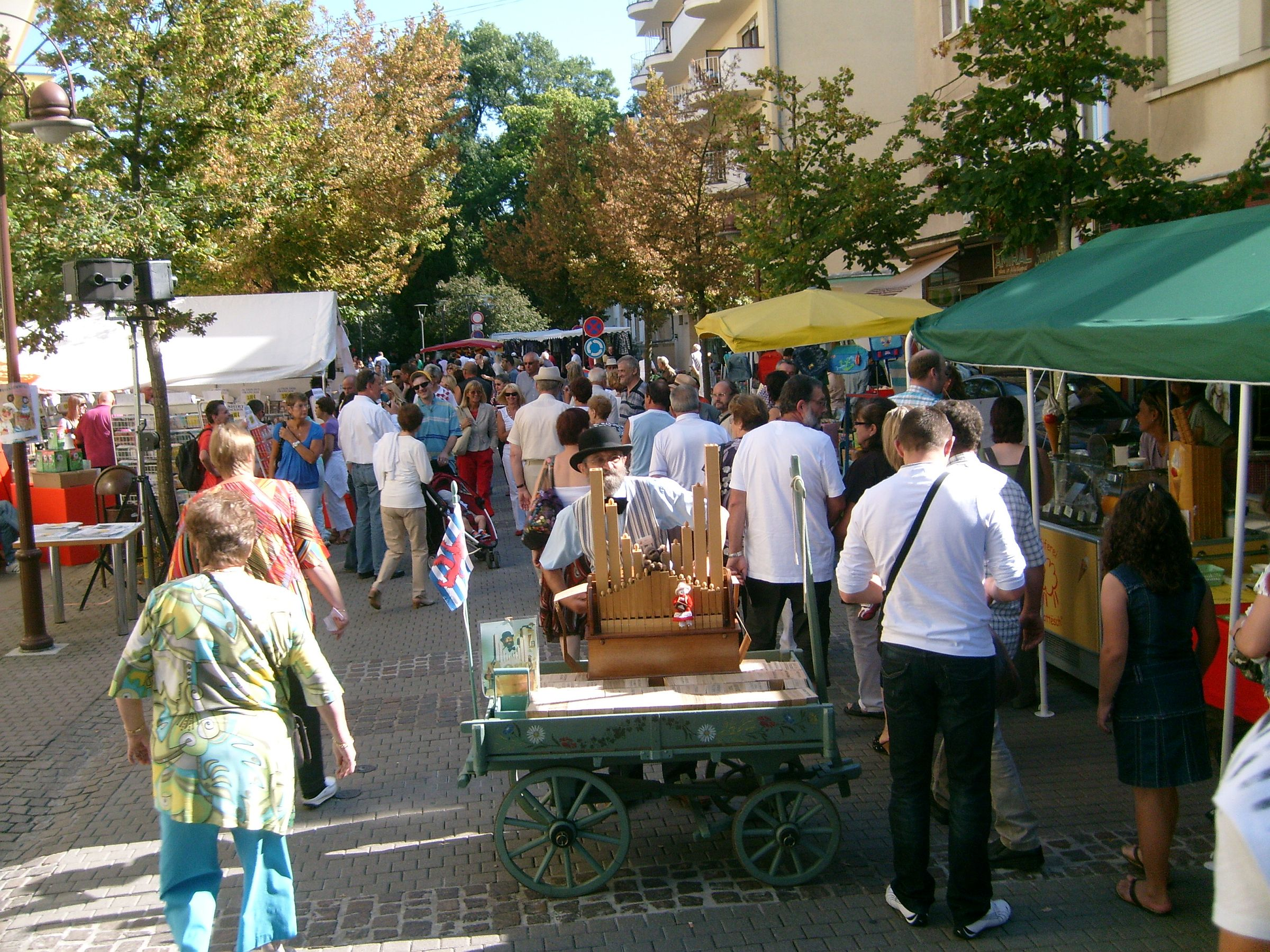
A braderie in Mondorf-les-Bains, Luxembourg, 2009

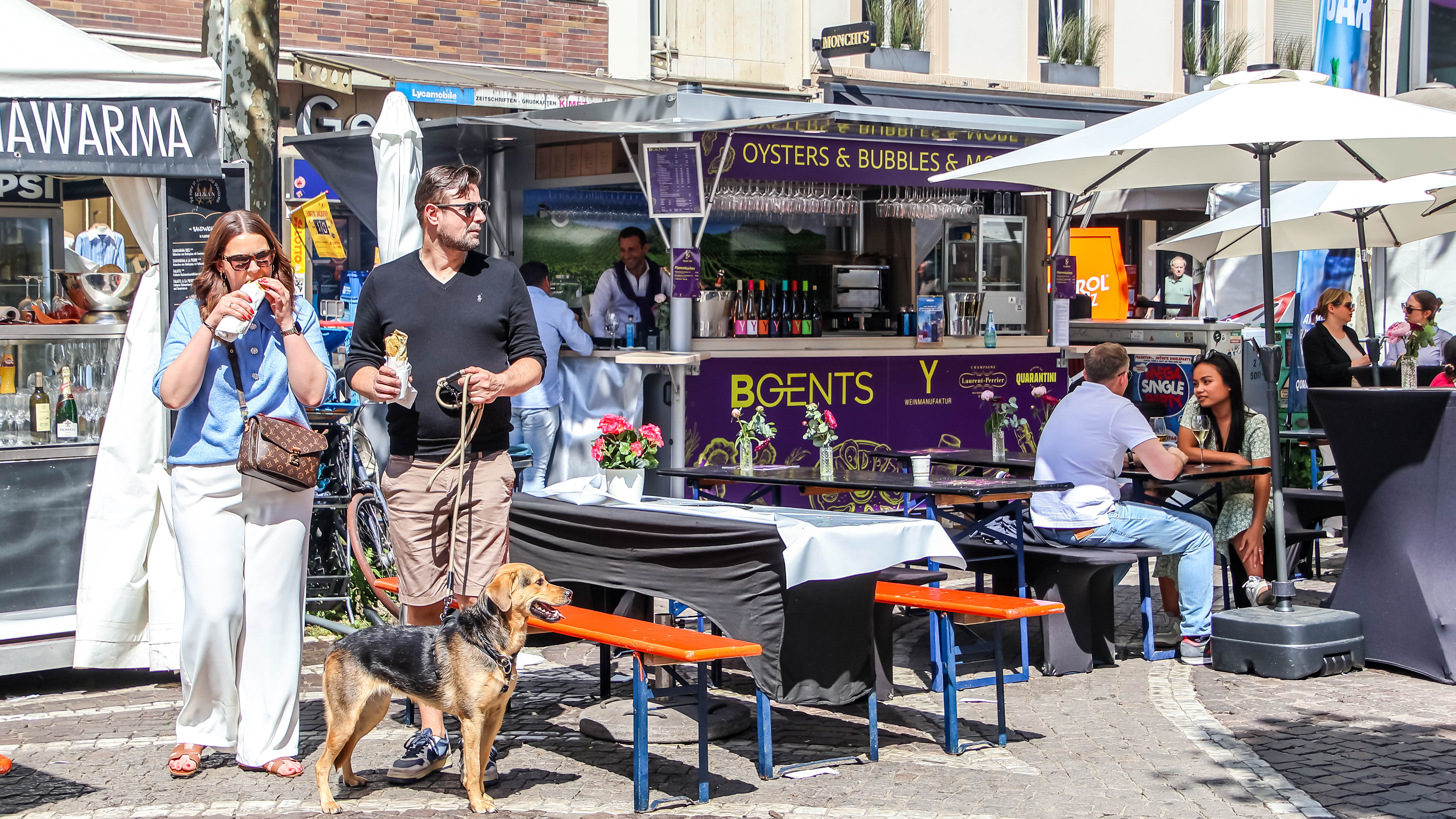
street fair in Frankfurt

== See also ==
- Festival
- Food festival
- Renaissance fair
