= Wilhelmstrassenfest =

Street festival in Wiesbaden, Germany

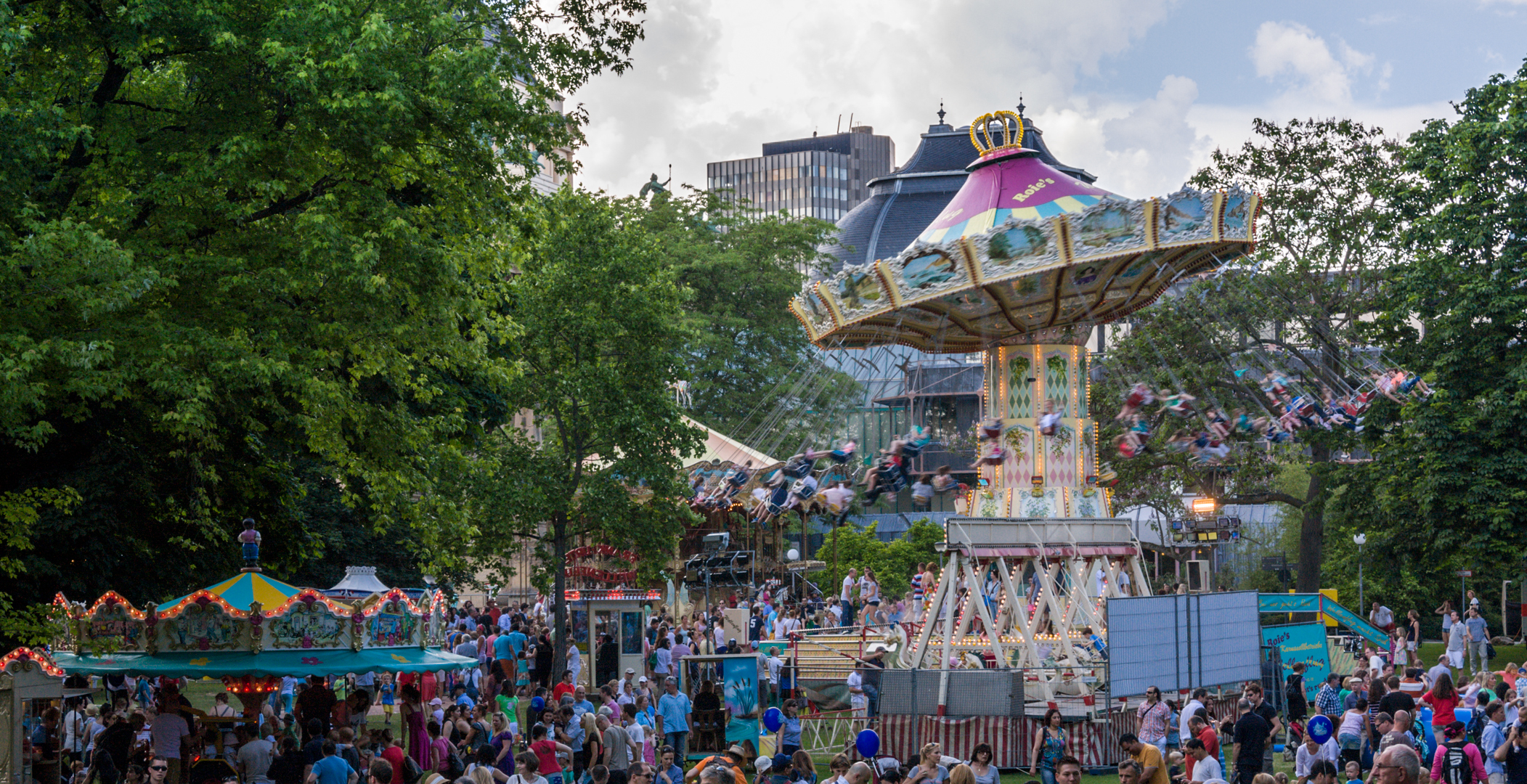
Wilhelmstraßenfest in 2013

The Wilhelmstraßenfest is an annual street festival in Wiesbaden, Germany, which began in 1977 in celebration for the reopening of the Hessian state theatre. With roughly 250,000 visitors attending on the two festival days, it is the largest street festival in Germany. It takes place annually during the second weekend of June, on Friday and Saturday, on the namesake Wilhelmstraße and in the adjacent parks of Bowling Green and Warmer Damm. Its official name is "Theatrium." The name "Theatrium" is derived from then from "theater" and "Atrium" (Latin for "open air"). The festival offers the largest outdoor event in the city, a variety of culinary specialties, and many music show performances, up to seven large and small stages, rides, a craft market with 130 exhibitors, and a grand finale: a fireworks show.
