= Braderie =

Annual market

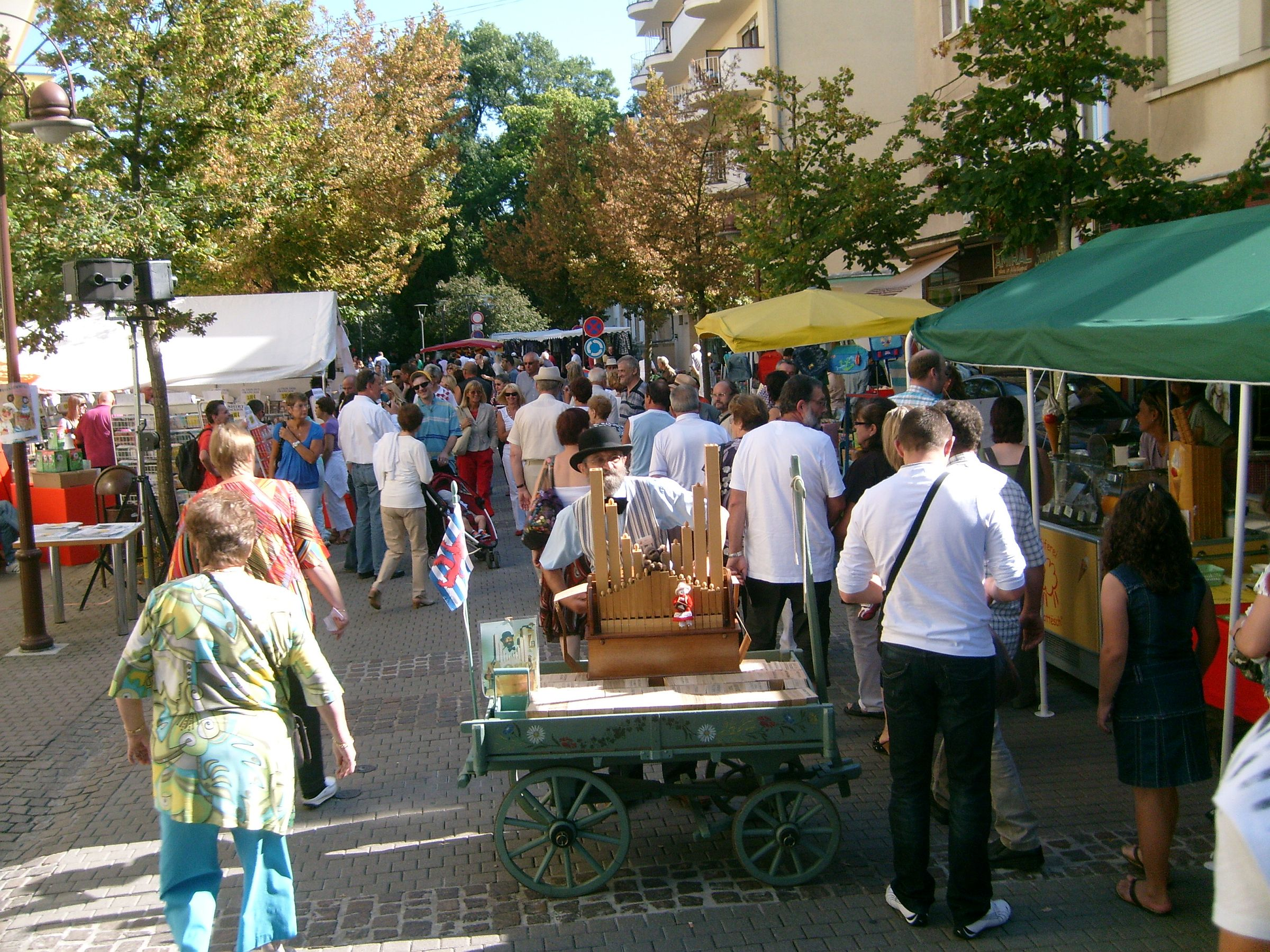
At a braderie, Mondorf-les-Bains, Luxembourg, 2009

A braderie (Dutch: [braːdəˈri]) or jaarmarkt (Dutch: [ˈjaːrmɑr(ə)kt], respectively meaning 'roasting' and 'annual market' in Dutch) is a type of grand yearly street fair and street market found in the Netherlands, Belgium, Luxembourg, Northern France and north-west Switzerland, mostly held in the summer months. There, nearly all towns and large villages have their own braderie and, especially in villages, they often are one of the key social events. Koningsdag is a traditional day for sales in the Netherlands.

Typically, the local vendors put up stands outside of their shops in which they will sell their goods at a reduced price. This basic set up is often accompanied by outside traders, various food stands, a flea market, craftsmen making traditional tools, art or footwear (such as wooden shoes), live music (often provided by a local boerenkapel), street theater and people in traditional garments.

One of the most famous Braderies in Europe, is the annual Braderie de Lille, France. It gathers millions of visitors.

== Etymology ==
The word "braderie" comes from the Flemish word "braden", meaning "to roast." Meat was sold in slaughterhouses or meat markets to people with sufficient financial means. When there were unsold items left over, the remainder was roasted and sold at low prices to less wealthy people waiting outside. By extension, "braderie" came to mean the sale of unsold goods from surrounding shops outside their usual outlets. The word has been adopted in an unchanged form into Luxembourgish and French, where it is regularly used for annual fairs, particularly in the north and west of France.

== See also ==
- Braderie de Lille – Annual flea market in France
- Fire sale – Sale of goods at extremely discounted prices
- Flea market – Street market or bazaar for used items
