= Sois Belge et tais-toi! =

Sois Belge et tais-toi! (English: Be Belgian and shut up!) is a Belgian satirical sketch comedy by André Remy, written in 1982. The work, a series of plays, deals principally with Belgian politics and Belgitudes.
