= Les Snuls =

Group of Belgian comedians

Les Snuls was a group of Belgian comedians who were active from 1989 to 1993. They were known for their weekly television program shown on Canal+ Belgique, and various disks. Their humour was mostly inspired by self-mockery and nonsense, much like the British comedy troupe Monty Python, and hijacking national symbols of Belgium and belgitudes (frites, chicons, Maurice Béjart, Jacques Brel, Gilles de Binche etc.). Les Snuls were famous for their guest presenters, mostly old ladies who didn't know they were part of a spoof, also not knowing their lines or the topics of the show. Additional commentaries, generally rude or mocking, were also added to the program. Ex: the presenter :"until next week," to which they add : "Yeh, without you!" They also produced the film, Film Belge.

The duo Jannin-Liberski have since produced various television series (such as J'aime autant de t'ouvrir les yeux, Twin fliks), disks and advertisements.

Members of Les Snuls:

- Kristiaan Debusscher – publicitaire, compositeur, musicien (member of Allez Allez)
- Nicolas Fransolet – publicitaire, compositeur, musicien (member of Allez Allez)
- Serge Honorez – publicitaire, réalisateur
- Frédéric Jannin – dessinateur (Germain et nous…), compositeur et musicien (Bowling balls, Zinno), homme de télévision
- Stefan Liberski – écrivain, réalisateur, publicitaire

Associate members:

- Bouli Lanners – réalisateur et acteur
- Laurence Bibot – humoriste, femme de télévision
- Raymond Coumans surnommé "Ray Coumix 2000 – philosophe, peintre"
- Benoît Poelvoorde – song "Les Américains"

== Best known subjects ==
- The things of Professor Decodor: Nico, playing "Professor Decodor," and his beautiful assistant Miss Bricola (Laurence Bibot) try to make their own decoder for the scrambled Canal + channels, using everyday objects. This segment always ends with "Oooh, that didn't work! Until next week."
- The snul-kit: with the aid of unrelated objects, a model (Kriss) shows how one can disguise oneself, at very little cost (Jacques Brel, Maurice Béjart, naked woman, various animals, political prisoner of Luxembourg…). The catchphrase of the segment is "You see! The effect is striking!"
- Santa Belgica (parody of Santa Barbara): where an announcer summarizes the previous episode. The series is actually made of extracts (turned ridiculous by the commentary) from a 1974 film of Pierre Manuel, Les Bonnes Manières (Good Manners). The catchphrase in the summary is: "Yves who was called Blaise who was called Dominique will, exceptionally, for today be called Yves again."
- Le Mage Bon-Rêve: played by Stefan Liberski, Louis Bon-Rêve, the president of the Belgian Surrealist Party, called "Le Mage Bon-Rêve" (English: Wise man Good Dream) uses this slot as a pretext to sell his magic endives.
- The maxim of the weekend (aka The Belgian is a philosopher): presents extracts from a documentary about the meeting of Michel Demaret and Raymond Coumans. The dialogues are shown, emphasising the insignificant or senseless remarks. Ex.: "The thing I like about the sea, it's that when it rains and stops, it's over, we have dry weather."

== Opening sequence ==
- 1st season: After a sign saying "Stand up", (to remind viewers to stand for the national anthem), the camera follows a long path of chips, in which are planted various symbols representing Belgian specialities: waffles from Liège, mussels, the Atomium, two tankards of beer being clinked and a flying endive. All that to the tune of Belgium's national anthem, the Brabançonne.
- 2nd season: the camera approaches Earth, zooming in on the zone representing Europe and finishes by focussing on Belgium, covered by chips. France can be seen, covered in French breads, bottles of wine, and camembert cheese. The Netherlands is shown covered in mussels. The music is the same as the first season.

== See also ==
- Belgitude
