= John Makin (singer) =

British singer (1950–2011)

John Makin, better known under his artist name "Mister John" (13 February 1950, Liverpool, England – 23 October 2011, Brussels, Belgium), was a British singer who lived in Belgium. He is best known for his feel-good novelty songs, among which the one-hit wonder song "Potverdekke! (It's great to be a Belgian)" is the best known. It was a hit in the Belgian hitparade in 1998 for 26 consecutive weeks.

== Biography ==
Makin was born in Warrington, England. His early music career saw him playing rhythm guitar and backing vocals in a local group The Inner Circle who played rock and pop covers around south Lancashire. The other members were:

John Farrah or possibly Farrer (vocals)

Dave Fairbrother (lead guitar and backing vocals)

Pete Bradbury (bass and backing vocals)

Dave Spencer (drums)

He moved to Brussels in 1972 where he worked as a professional quantity surveyor. He became a professional folk and blues singer and guitarist in 1976, recording his first album, Urban Romance, that same year. In 1980 he launched an independent record company OK Records, which was signed by Polygram and released his first single "Anglais Franglais" worldwide.

In 1998 he scored a hit single with the number "Potverdekke! (It's great to be a Belgian)", which he wrote together with some Belgian friends. The song was so popular that he was allowed to perform it during the celebration of the national holiday in Brussels that year.

He was also active as a member of the British United Football Club and a former captain of the club's first team, which plays in the Belgian amateur league.

Makin kept performing up until his death in 2011, usually in the company of clarinet player Doctor Rob. He was married and had two sons from a previous marriage. After his death he was cremated.

== Partial discography ==
=== Albums ===
- Urban Romance (1976)
- Live at the Planet (1985)
- Essentials (2004) (compilation album)

=== Singles ===
- "Anglais Franglais" (1981)
- "Potverdekke! (It's great to be a Belgian)" (1998)
- "The Eurosong" (1999)
- "You're Only as Old as You Feel" (1999)
- "The Queen Mum song" (2000)
- "Mama Mia" (2004)
- "The Greek Song" (2011)
