= Braderie de Lille =

Annual flea market in France

Coordinates: 50.6368°N 3.0688°E

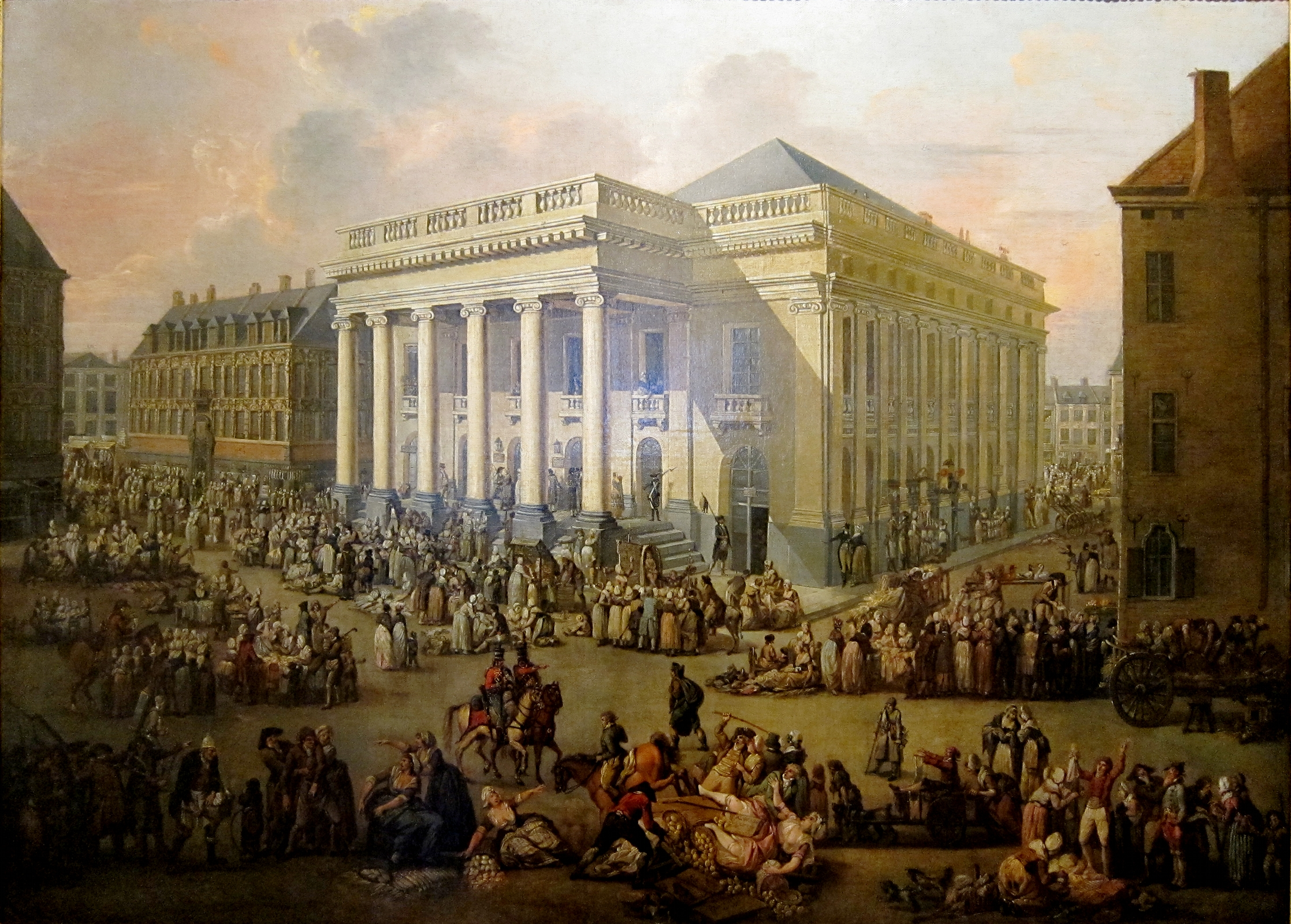
La Braderie by François Watteau (1799–1800)

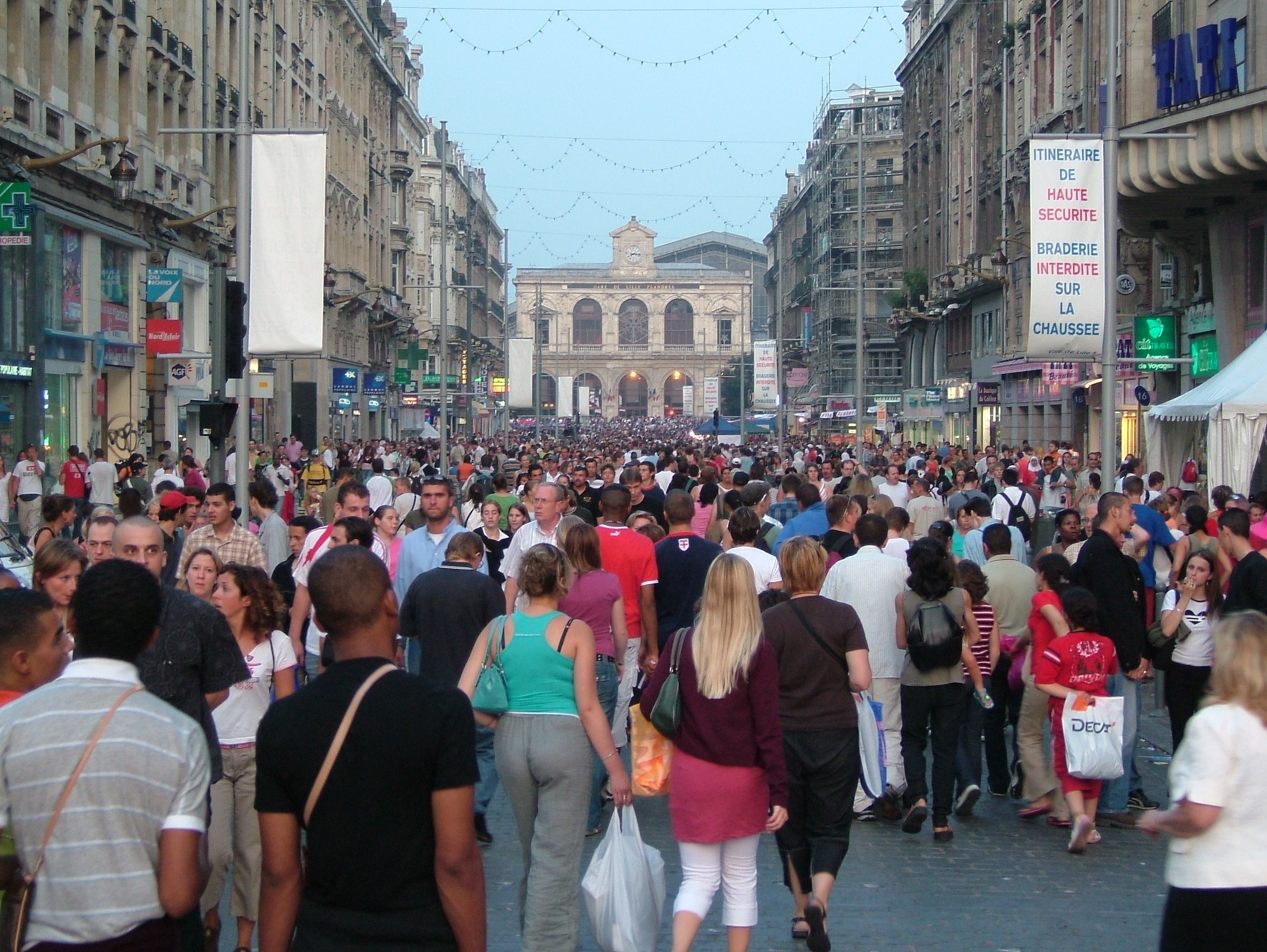
The Braderie de Lille (2015)

The Lille Braderie (French: Braderie de Lille) is a braderie, or annual street market/flea market, that takes place on the weekend of the first Sunday of September in Lille, France, in the northern Hauts-de-France region. It dates back to the 12th century, attracting nearly three million visitors each year. The Braderie de Lille is one of the largest gatherings in France and the largest flea market in Europe. In 2014 the Braderie was reported to host 100 km of market stalls to over 10,000 exhibitors.

During the Braderie, the city hosts a music festival. The traditional food eaten during the festival, moules-frites, typically results in built-up heaps of mussel shells around the city.

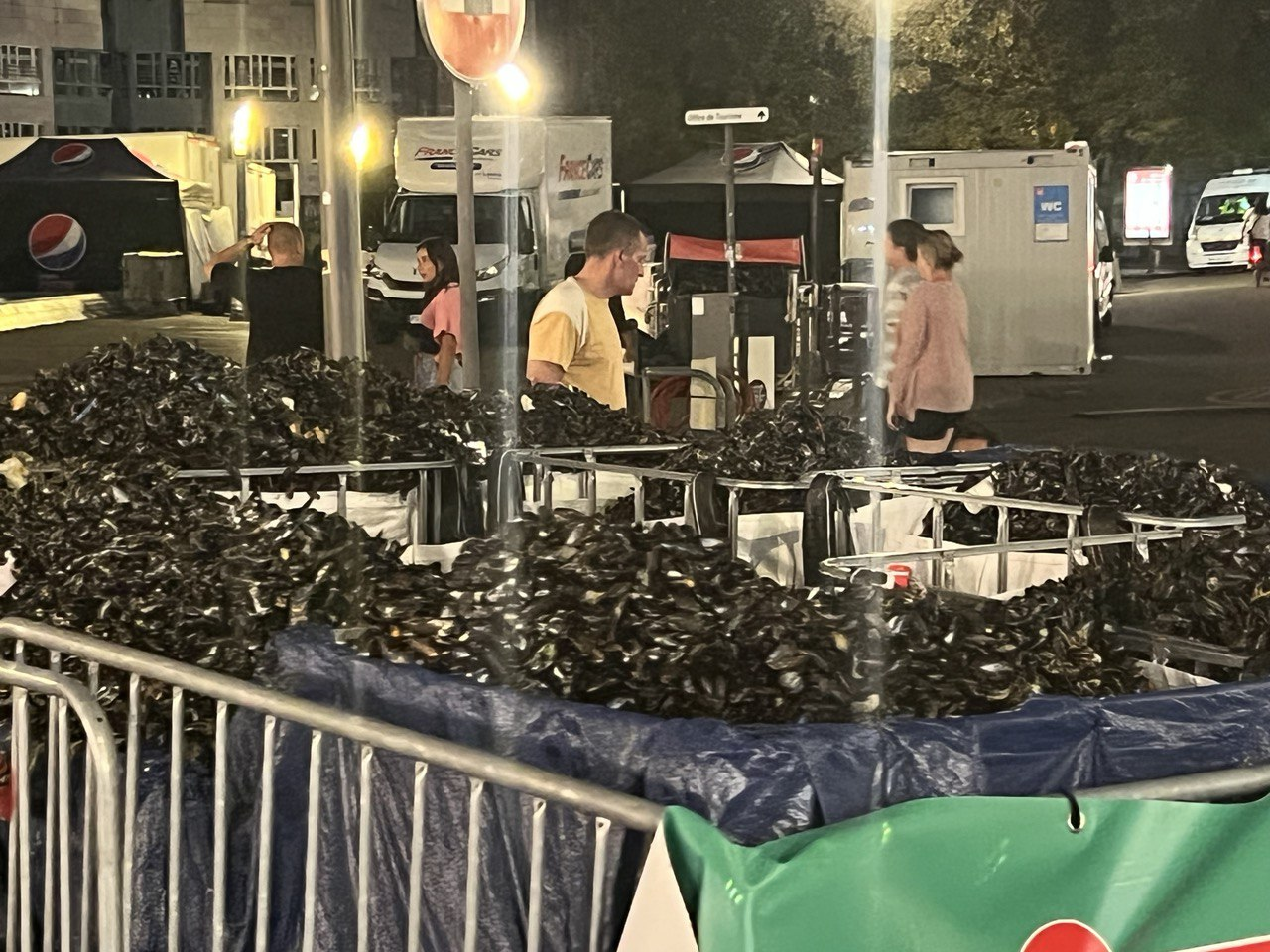
A container of mussel shells during the Braderie de Lille, 2022

In 2016, the Braderie was cancelled by Lille mayor Martine Aubry, following terrorist incidents in France.
