= Corn School =

Festival in LaGrange, Indiana, U.S.

Coordinates: 41.64014°N 85.4196°W

Corn School is a festival that takes place in downtown LaGrange, Indiana, in between the last week of September or the first week of October (depending on the year). Begun in 1906, it was originally started as a one-day festival for boys in the local corn growing classes to show off their products. They were to receive prizes for their corn, and a day was to be designated in their honor. Notables such as the Governor of Indiana Frank Hanly and the State Secretary of Agriculture were speakers for the event for the first couple of years.

Since 1909, Corn School has opened on Tuesday and continued for a week. Its premium list was increased to include livestock, poultry, farm products, needlework, fruit, pastry and for a time, 4-H Club work. Then came the Corn School Week parades, and prizes for the various events soon rose to a total of $3,000 a year. In 1938, the LaGrange County Corn School, Inc., was established as a non-profit corporation. Fortune telling became popular at the fair, and parades did as well. The classic car parade is a major feature of Corn School, with local and nearby car owners showing off their cars. All parades are led by the presiding Corn School Queen, a tradition started in 1950. The Corn School Queen is chosen through a pageant; during this time, the "Citizen Of The Year" is also named.

The festival has gone from a simple harvest awards day to a week-long celebration with carnival rides, games, talent shows, food vendors, parades, and still traditionally; the vegetable awards. Crafts and canned goods are displayed in the public library. The Corn School Queen is crowned every year, and local businesses still contribute prizes.

Corn School went on hiatus in 1917–18, 1942–1944 and 2020.
