= Moules-frites =

Dish of mussels and fries

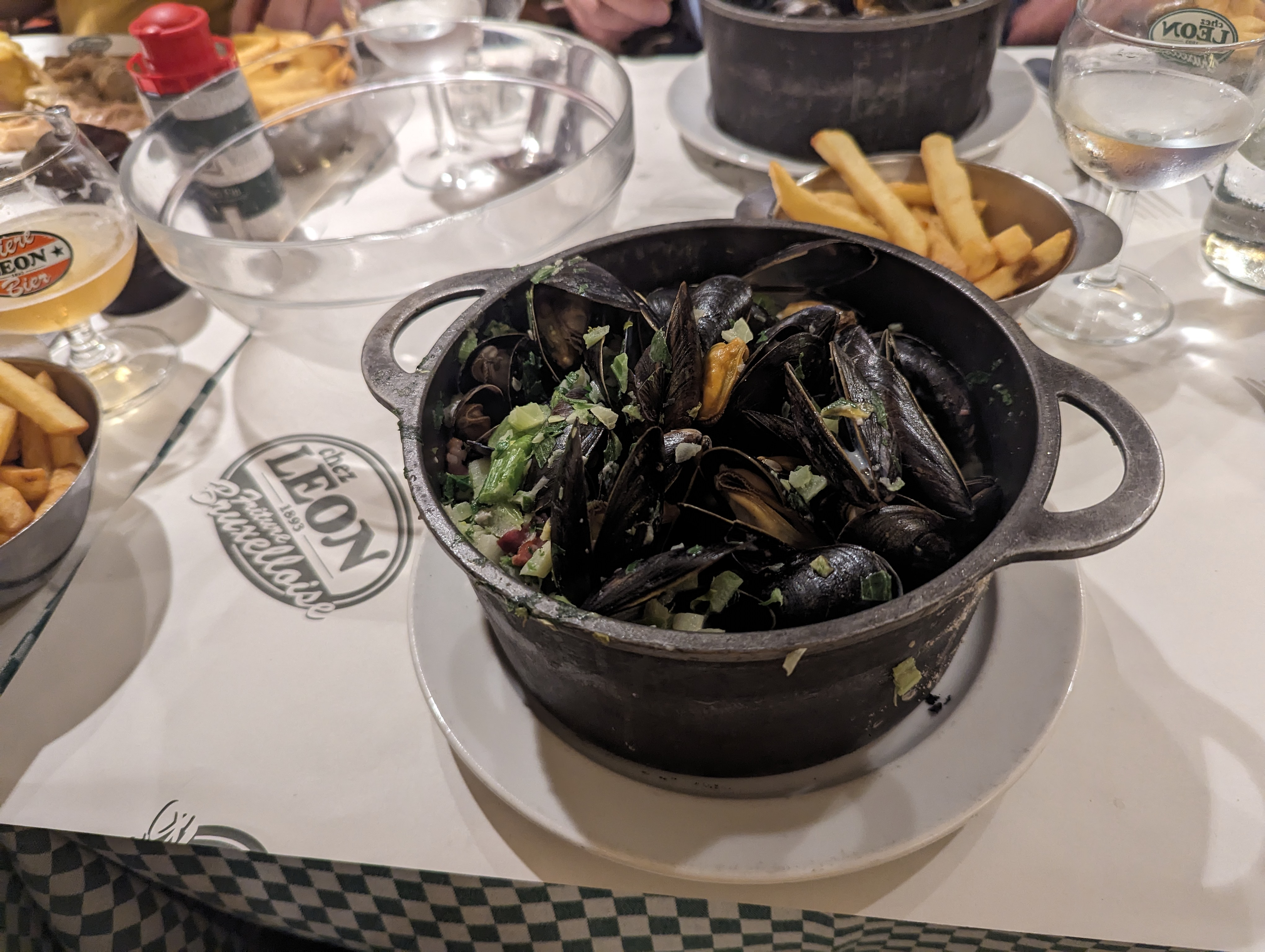
- Moules, served in the pan, with fries.
- Alternative names: Mosselen-friet (in Dutch)
- Course: Main course
- Place of origin: Belgium; France
- Serving temperature: Hot
- Main ingredients: Mussels and potatoes

Moules-frites or moules et frites (French pronunciation: [mul.fʁit]]; Dutch: mosselen-friet) is a main dish of mussels and French fries originating in Northern France and Belgium. The name is French, moules meaning mussels and frites fries, with the Dutch name for the dish meaning the same. It is the national dish of Belgium.

== Background ==
Although moules-frites are popular in many countries, it is thought that the dish originated in Belgium. It is likely that it was originally created by combining mussels, a popular and cheap foodstuff eaten around the Flemish coast, and fried potatoes, which were commonly eaten around the country in winter when no fish or other food was available.

In both Belgium and France, moules-frites are available in most restaurants, depending on season. According to a survey conducted by TNS in 2011, moules-frites was identified as the second-favourite dish in France, receiving a vote of 20 per cent, narrowly losing to magret de canard which received 21 per cent.

On average, between 25 and 30 tonnes of mussels are consumed each year in Belgium as moules-frites. Much of the mussels consumed in Belgium come from mussel farms in nearby Zeeland in the Netherlands.

== Variants and preparation ==
=== Moules ===
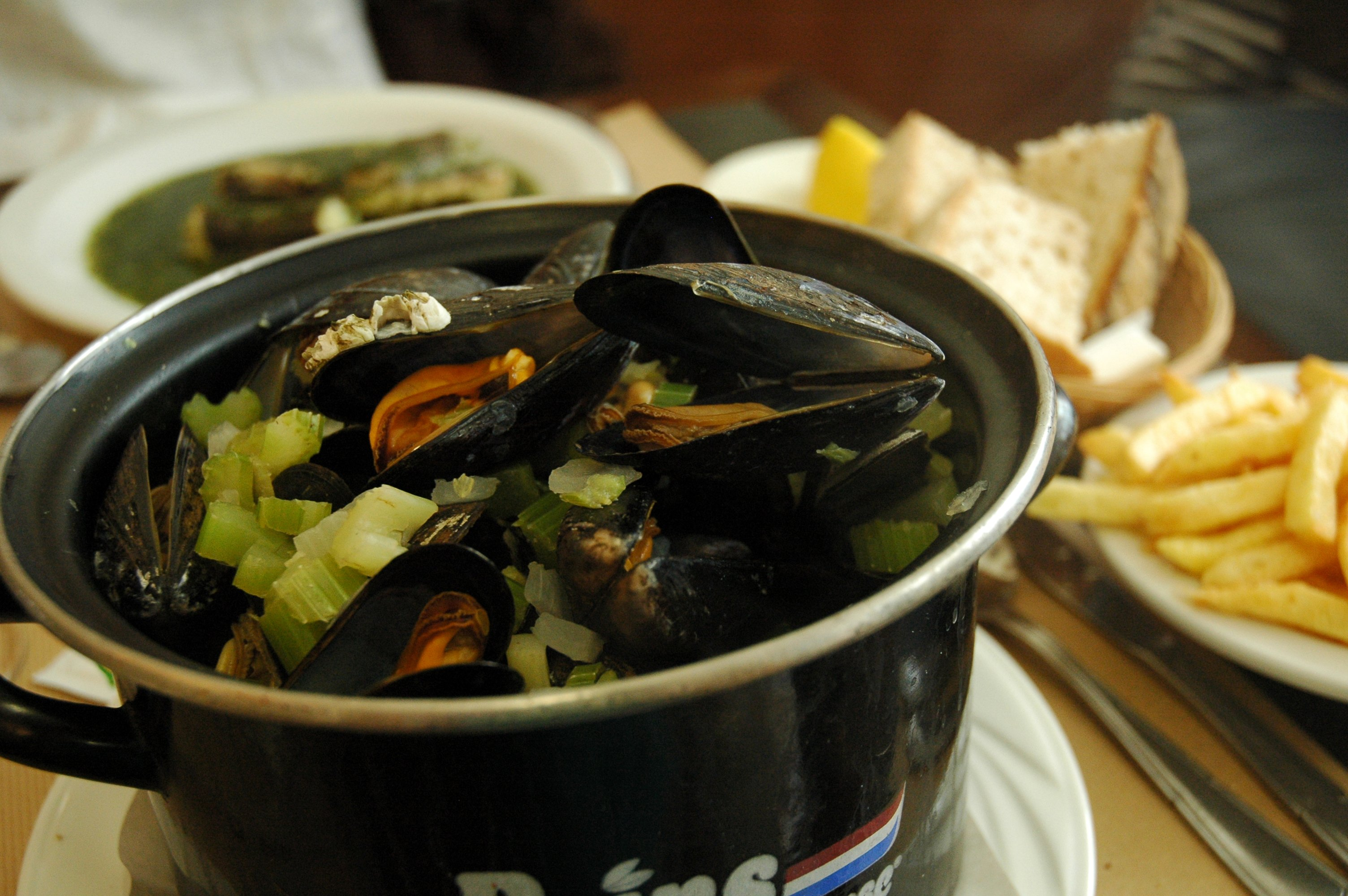
Moules marinière in Belgium

The ways in which the mussels are cooked in the dish can vary significantly. Some common variants include:

- Moules marinière: Probably the most common and internationally recognisable recipe, moules marinière includes white wine, shallots, parsley, and butter.
- Moules nature: The mussels are steamed with celery, leeks, and butter.
- Moules à la crème: Another common recipe, thickened with flour and cream.
- Moules parquées: A dish, probably originating in Brussels, of raw mussels on the half-shell, served with a lemon-mustard sauce.
- Moules à la bière: Mussels cooked in a sauce containing beer instead of white wine.
- Moules à l'ail: Mussels cooked with sliced or minced garlic.

Less commonly, fusion variants are seen in which the stock may be flavoured with non-local ingredients such as Espelette pepper or Pernod liquor. They can also be served with "Mosselsaus", a sauce that is made with mayonnaise, mustard, and vinegar.

=== Frites ===
In various forms, frites or friet play an important role in Belgian culture and cuisine. Within Belgium, bintje potatoes are generally preferred as a basis to make fries because of their high starch content. They are generally double-fried (fried, left to cool and then fried again) in order to make them both moist in the core and crisp on the outside.

=== Presentation ===
As a dish, the moules and the frites are usually served separately, to avoid the fries becoming soggy in the sauce. Often, the moules are served in the pan used to cook them. A second dish is generally provided for the discarded mussel shells.

== Consumption ==
Mussels and French fries are served everywhere in Belgium, from the Belgian coast to the bottom of the Ardennes. In France, the dish is common in the Nord-Pas-de-Calais. It is the typical dish of the braderie of Lille. In 2009, 500 tons of mussels and 30 tons of fries were consumed during this event. During this weekend, restaurant owners pile up the mussels eaten in front of their establishments; most of the time, the restaurants Aux moules (rue de Béthune) and La Chicorée (place Rihour) have the largest quantities.

In 2008, TNS Sofres carried out a survey among the people of the North. Mussels and French fries came in second place with 25%. The dish is outstripped by steak frites which gets 33%. In France, according to the same TNS-Sofres poll, moules-frites are in second place among the favorite dishes of the French with 20%. It is one point behind duck breast.

The dish can be consumed with an abbey lager or a dry white wine; red wine should be avoided because of its tannins. As for sauces, in addition to the marinière sauce that already accompanies the mussels, it is possible to add mayonnaise with the fries. Mussels and fries are also the specialty of the Belgian restaurant chain Chez Léon.

== See also ==
- Fish and chips
- List of seafood dishes
- Cuisine and specialties of Nord-Pas-de-Calais
