= Wiesbaden =

Capital of Hesse, Germany

- City
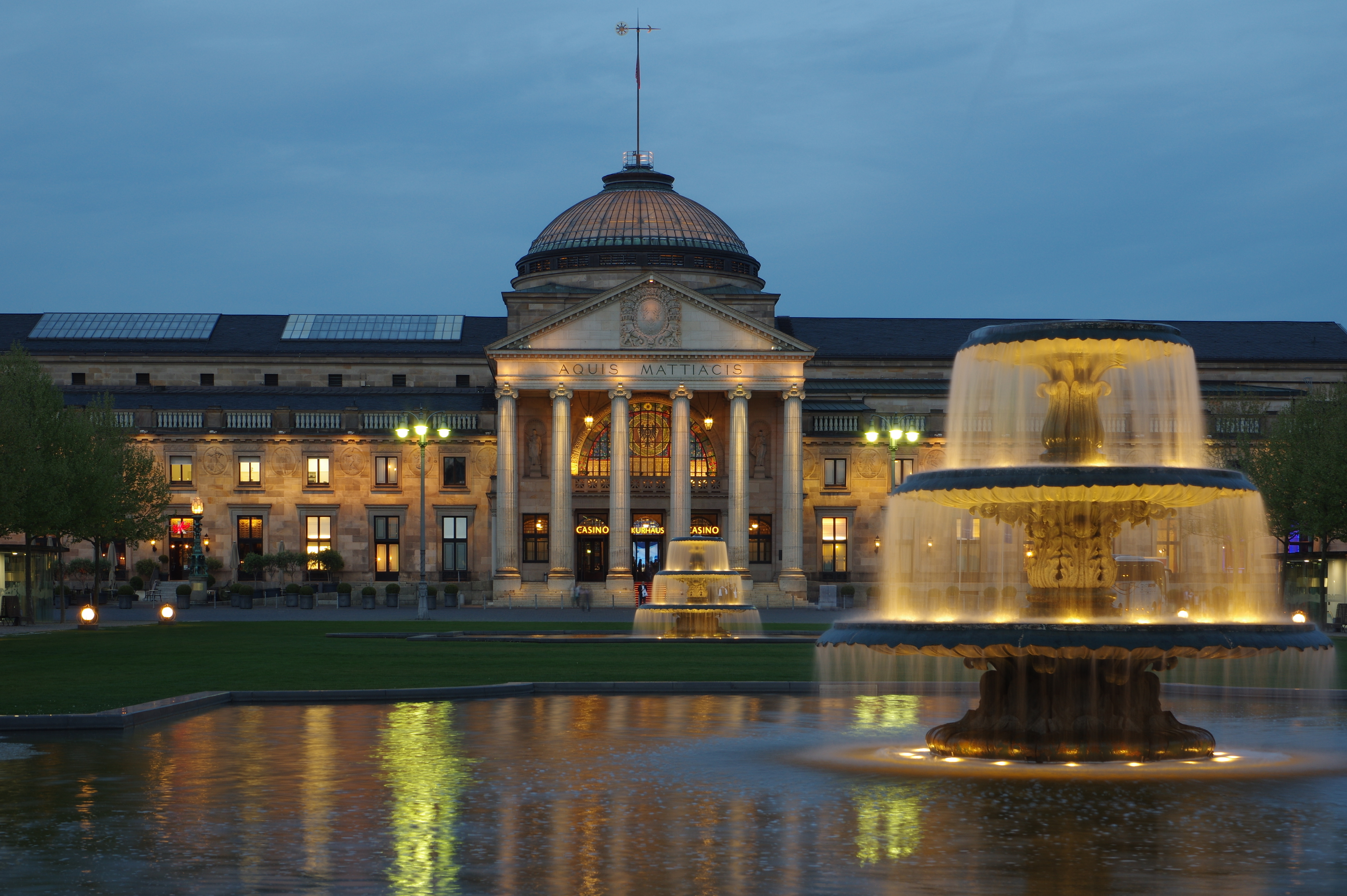
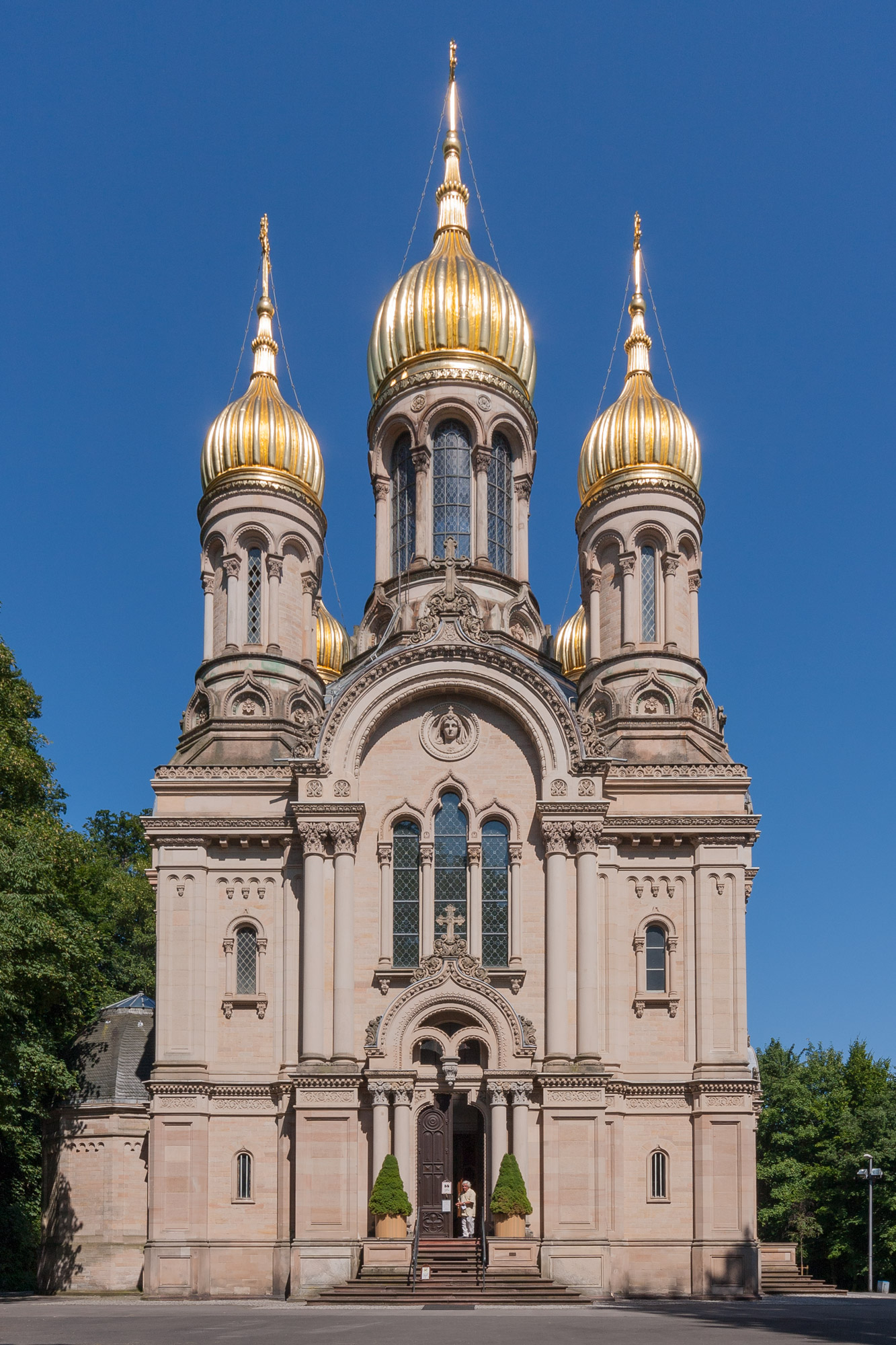
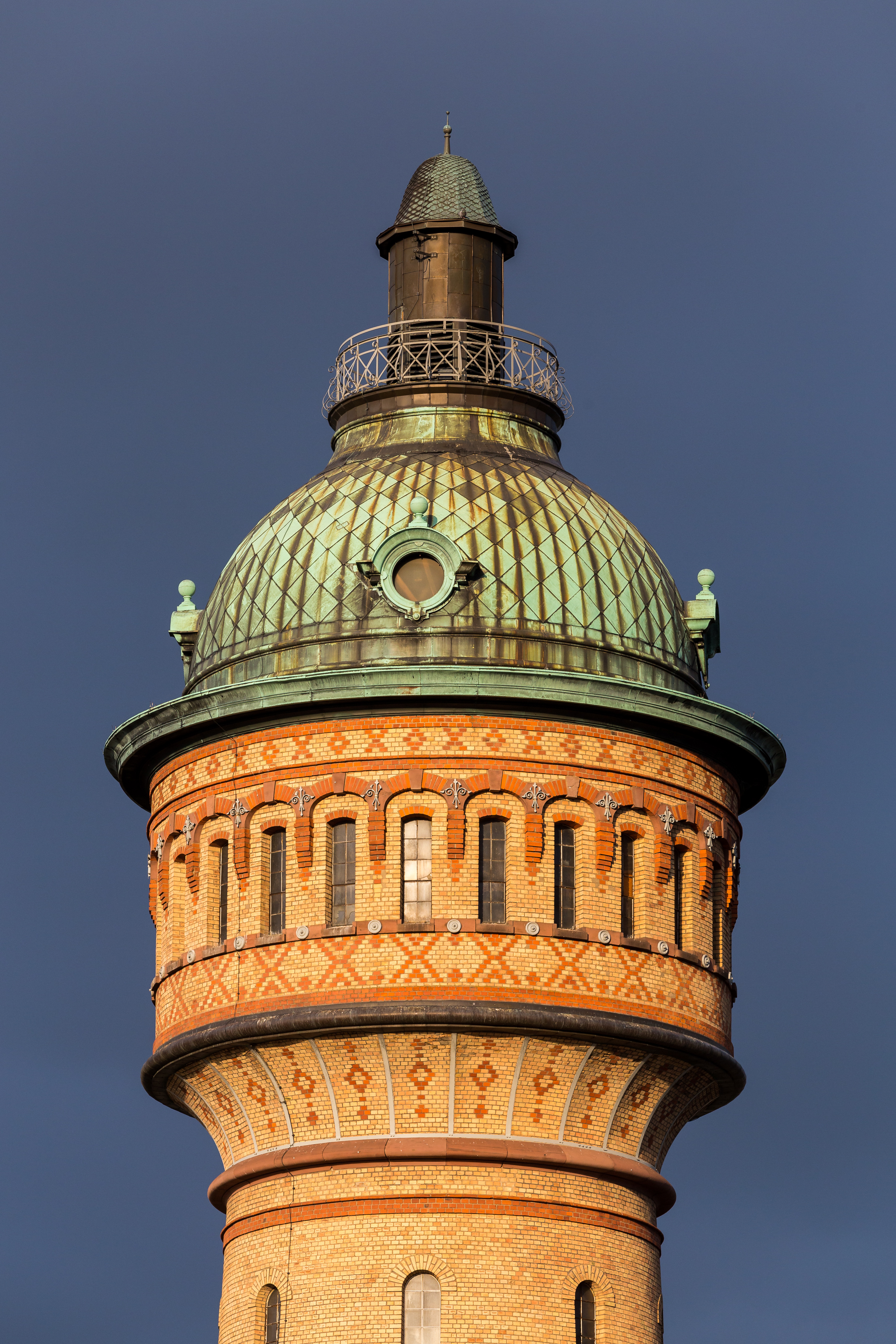
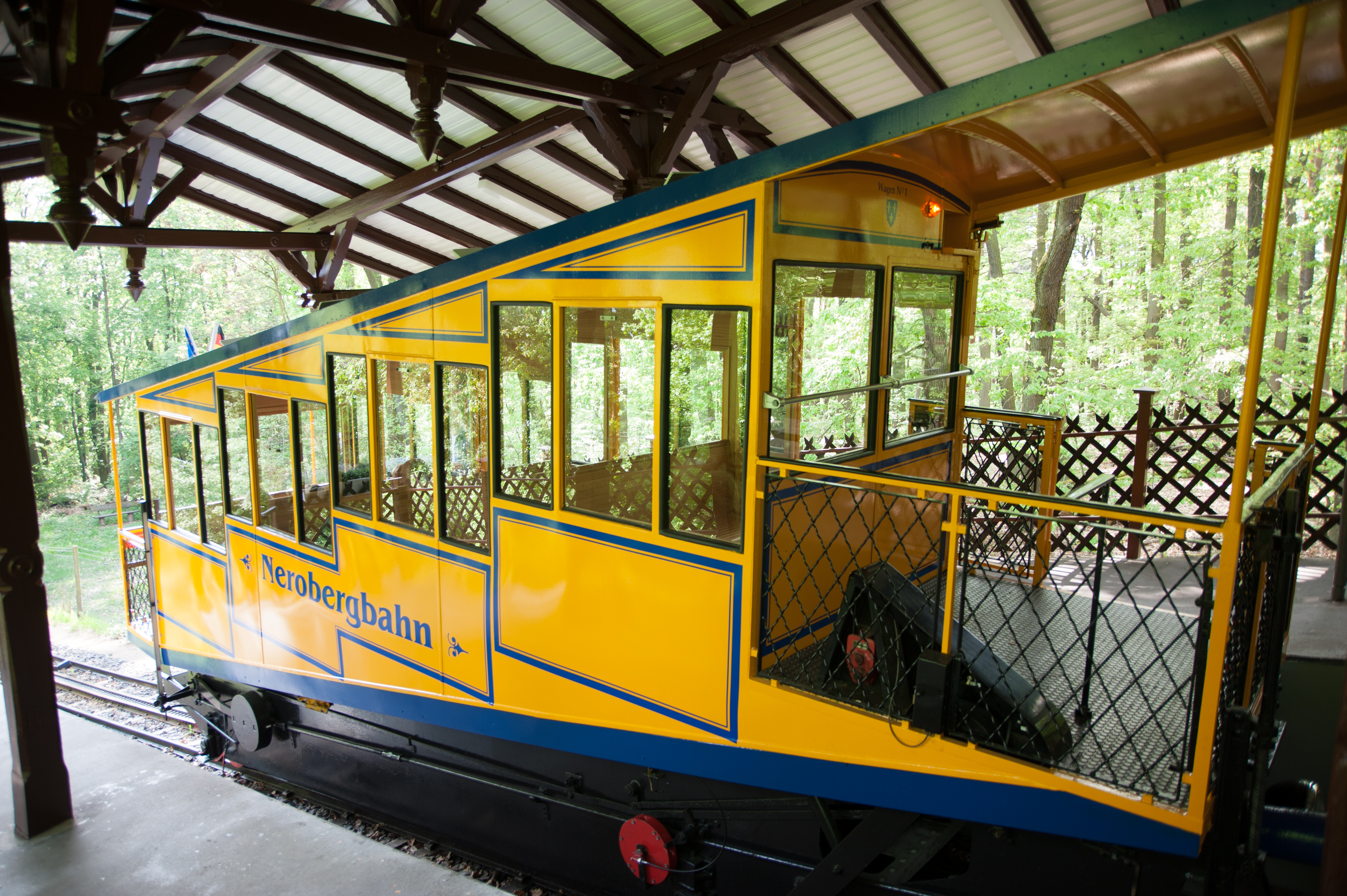
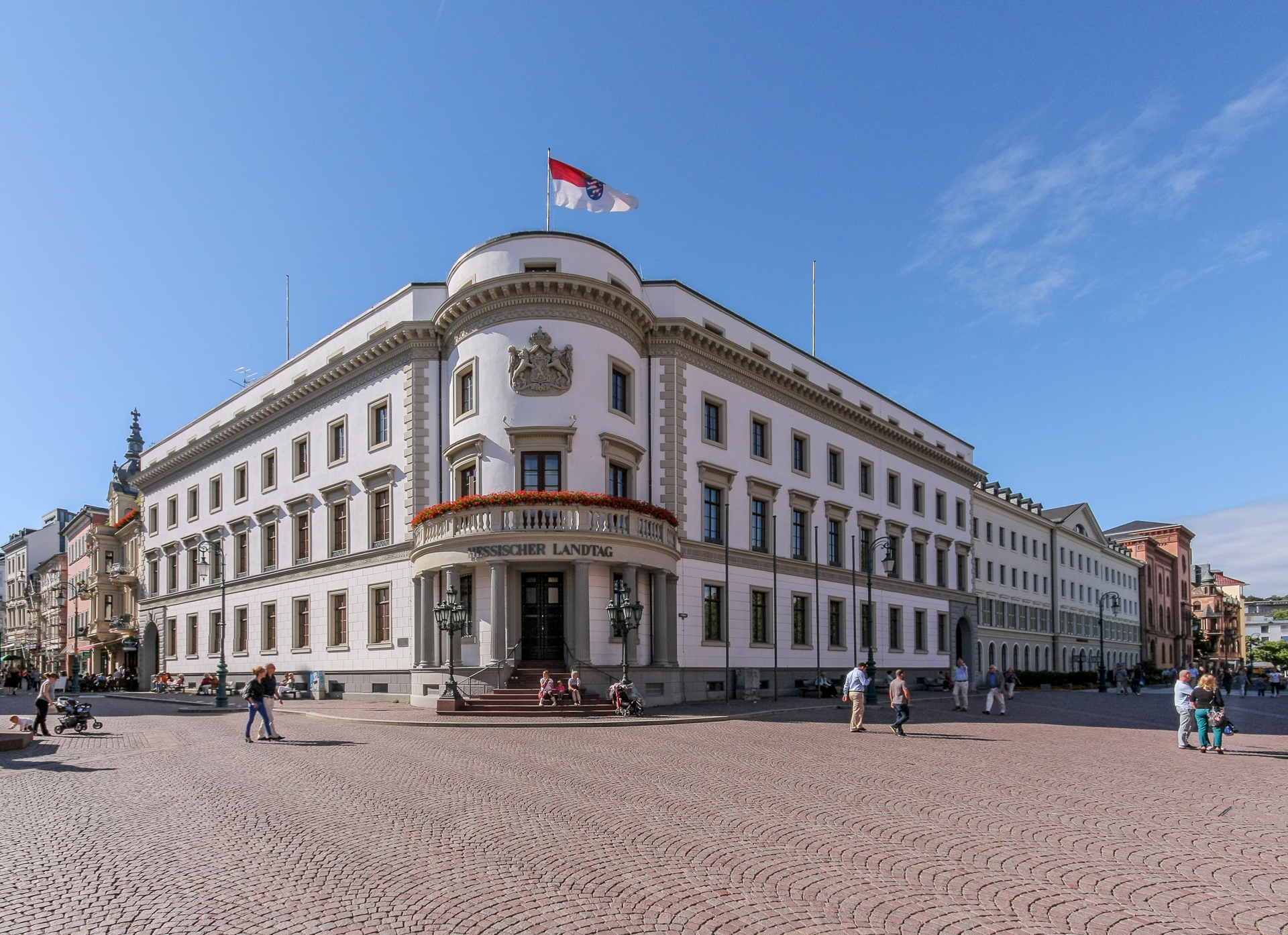
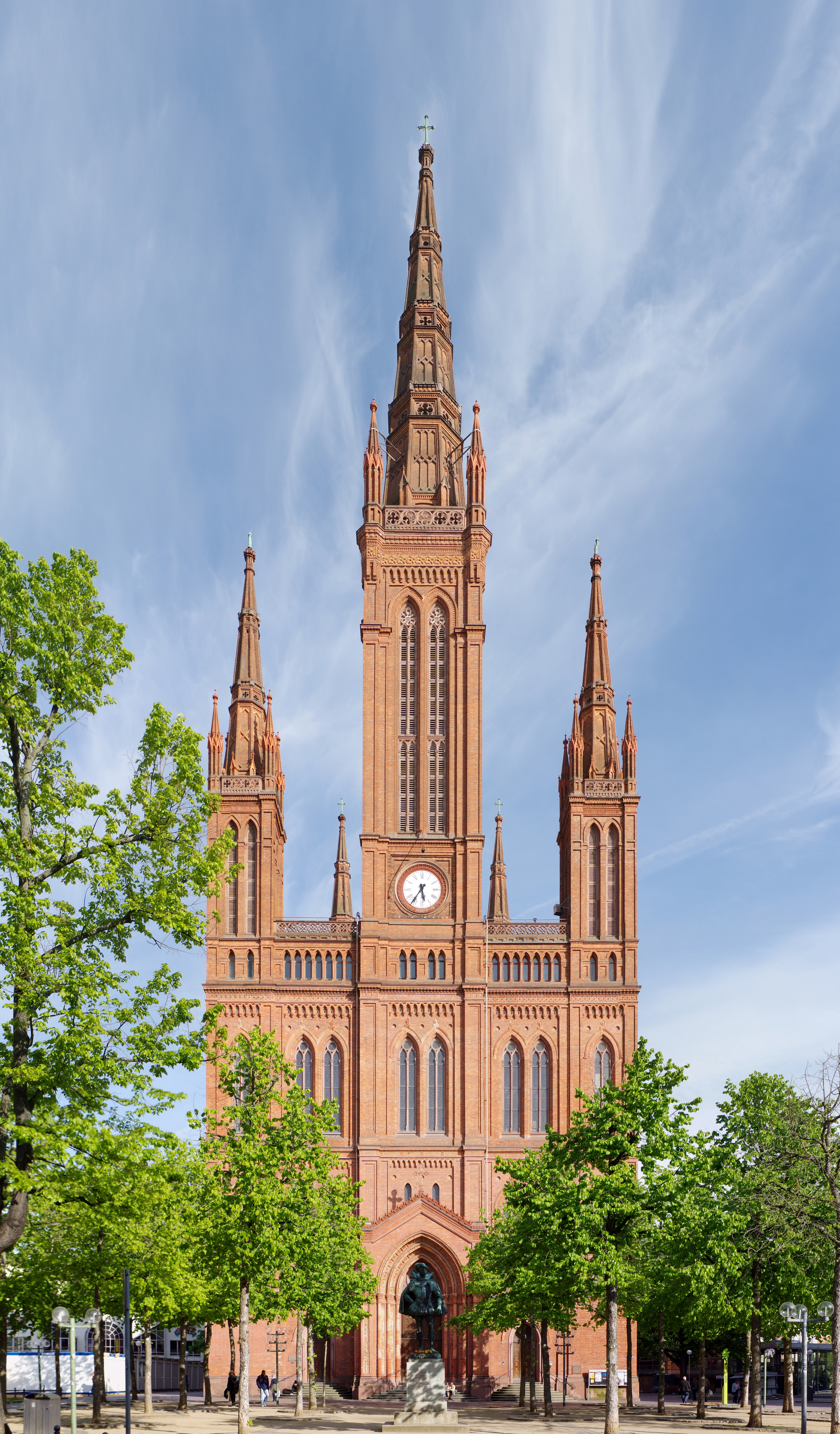
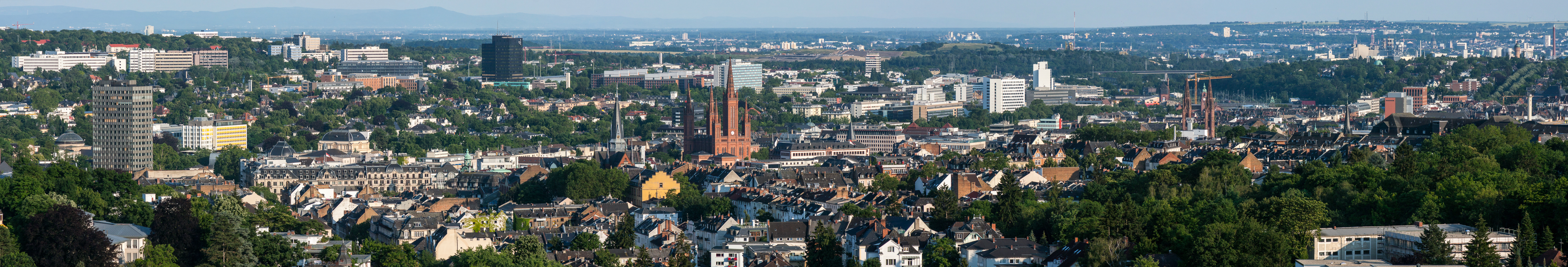
- Kurhaus Wiesbaden Russian Church Biebrich Water Tower Neroberg Funicular City Palace Market Church View over Wiesbaden from Neroberg

- Flag Coat of arms Logo

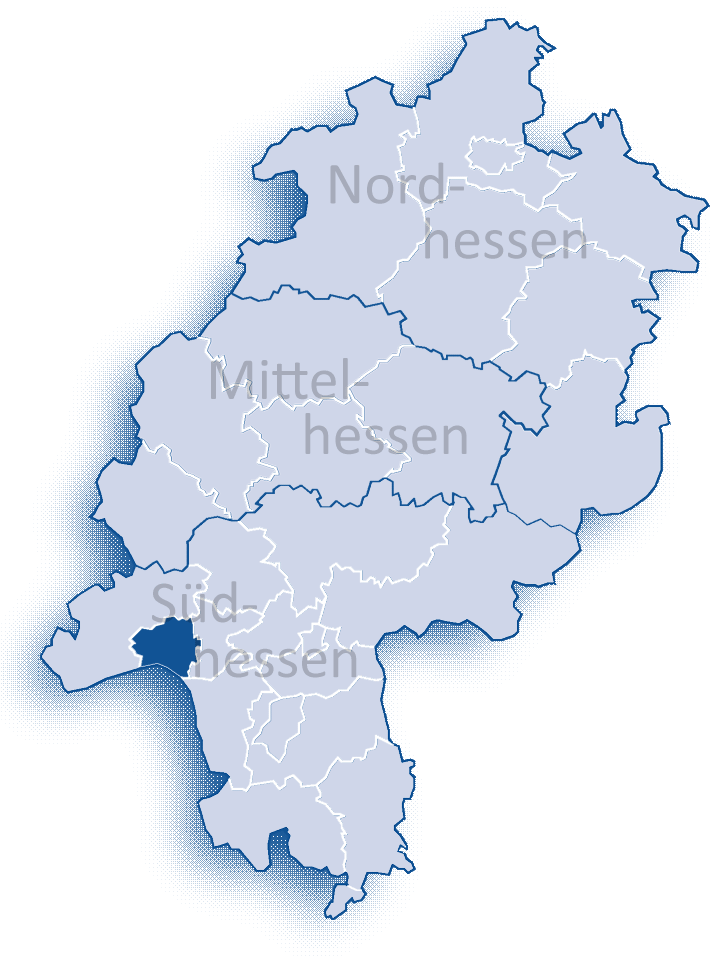
- Location of Wiesbaden within Hessen
- Interactive map of Wiesbaden
- Location within Germany Location within Hesse
- Coordinates: 50°04′57″N 08°14′24″E
- Country: Germany
- State: Hesse
- Admin. region: Darmstadt
- District: Urban district
- Founded: 121
- Subdivisions: 26 boroughs

Government
  - Mayor (2019–25): Gert-Uwe Mende (SPD)
  - Governing parties: CDU/ SPD

Area
  - Total: 203.9 km^{2} (78.7 sq mi)
- Elevation: 115 m (377 ft)

Population (2025-12-31)
  - Total: 288,584
  - Density: 1,415/km^{2} (3,666/sq mi)
- Time zone: UTC+01:00 (CET)
  - Summer (DST): UTC+02:00 (CEST)
- Postal codes: 65183–65207; 55246 (Mainz-Kostheim); 55252 (Mainz-Kastel)
- Dialling codes: 0611, 06122, 06127, 06134
- Vehicle registration: WI
- Website: wiesbaden.de

Wiesbaden (German: [ˈviːsˌbaːdn̩]; lit. 'meadow baths') is the capital of the German state of Hesse, and the second-largest Hessian city after Frankfurt am Main. With around 283,000 inhabitants, it is Germany's 24th-largest city. Wiesbaden forms a conurbation with a population of around 500,000 with the neighbouring city of Mainz. This conurbation is in turn embedded in the Rhine-Main Metropolitan Region—Germany's second-largest metropolitan region after Rhine-Ruhr—which also includes the nearby cities of Frankfurt am Main, Darmstadt, Offenbach am Main, and Hanau, and has a combined population exceeding 5.8 million.

The city is located on the Rhine (Upper Rhine), at the foothills of the Taunus, opposite the Rhineland-Palatine capital of Mainz, and the city centre is located in the wide valley of the small Salzbach stream. Wiesbaden lies in the Rheingau wine-growing region, one of Germany's 13 wine regions. Three of Wiesbaden's boroughs were part of the city of Mainz until 1945, and still bear the designation "Mainz" in their names—the so-called AKK-boroughs of Mainz-Amöneburg, Mainz-Kastel, and Mainz-Kostheim. This so-called AKK-Konflikt (de:AKK-Konflikt) is the main cause for the rivalry between Mainz and Wiesbaden. Wiesbaden Main Station is connected to Frankfurt am Main by the Rhine-Main S-Bahn rapid transit system.

Historically, Wiesbaden was a Nassauian city. From 1170 to 1629, it lay in the County of Nassau, and from 1629 to 1721, it was in the county and later principality of Nassau-Idstein, all of which were territories within the Holy Roman Empire ruled by branches of the House of Nassau. In 1728, the city found itself in the principality of Nassau-Usingen, and in 1744, Biebrich Palace became the main residence of the House of Nassau-Usingen. In 1806, the city became the capital of the Duchy of Nassau. Since 1841, the newly built Wiesbaden City Palace was the principal Nassauian residence. From 1868 to 1944, the city lay in the Prussian Province of Hesse-Nassau, and from 1944 to 1945, it was the capital of the Province of Nassau. In 1945, it became the capital of Greater Hesse and subsequently, in 1946, of Hesse.

Wiesbaden is one of the oldest spa towns in Europe. Its name translates to "meadow baths", and there are 15 mineral springs—14 of which are hot springs—in the city centre. With a yield of around 2 million liters daily, Wiesbaden is the second-most productive German spa after Aachen. Its location in a mountain basin at the southern foot of the Taunus, protected by the mountains in the north and west, gives Wiesbaden a mild climate. It has been called the "Nice of the North" because of its climate and architecture. The city of Wiesbaden is one of the wealthiest cities in Germany and one of those with above-average purchasing power. The United States Army Europe and Africa headquarters is located in Wiesbaden-Erbenheim.

== Geography ==
Wiesbaden is situated on the right (northern) bank of the Rhine, above the confluence of the Main, where the Rhine's main direction changes from north to west. The city is across the Rhine from Mainz, the capital of the state of Rhineland-Palatinate. Frankfurt am Main is located about 38 kilometres (23.6 mi) east. To the north of the city are the Taunus Mountains, which trend in a northeasterly direction.

The city center, the Stadtmitte, is located in the north-easternmost part of the Upper Rhine Valley at the spurs of the Taunus mountains, about 5 kilometres (3.1 mi) from the Rhine. The landscape is formed by a wide lowland between the Taunus heights in the north, the Bierstadter Höhe and the Hainerberg in the east, the Mosbacher Mountain in the south, and the Schiersteiner Mountain in the west, an offshoot of the Taunus range.

The downtown is drained only by the narrow valley of the Salzbach, a tributary of the Rhine, on the eastern flanks of the Mosbacher Mountain. The city's main railway line and the Mainz road (Mainzer Straße) follow this valley. Several other streams drain into the Salzbach within the city center: the Wellritzbach, the Kesselbach, the Schwarzbach, the Dambach, and the Tennelbach, as well as the outflow of many thermal and mineral springs in the Kurhaus (spa) district. Above the city center, the Salzbach is better known as the Rambach.

The highest point of the Wiesbaden municipality is located northwest of the city center near the summit of the Hohe Wurzel, with an elevation of 608 metres (1,995 ft) above sea level. The lowest point is the harbour entrance of Schierstein at 83 metres (272 ft) above sea level. The central square (the Schlossplatz, or palace square) is at an elevation of 115 metres (377 ft).

Wiesbaden covers an area of 204 km^{2} (79 sq mi). It is 17.6 kilometres (10.9 mi) from north to south and 19.7 kilometres (12.2 mi) from west to east. In the north are vast forest areas, which cover 27.4% of the urban area. In the west and east are vineyards and agricultural land, which cover 31.1% of the area. Of the municipality's 79-kilometre-long (49.1 mi) border, the Rhine makes up 10.3 kilometres (6.4 mi).

=== Climate ===
Wiesbaden has a temperate-oceanic climate (Köppen: Cfb; Trewartha: Dobk) with relatively cold winters and warm summers. Its average annual temperature is 9.8 °C (49.6 °F), with monthly mean temperatures ranging from 1.2 °C (34.2 °F) in January to 18.9 °C (66.0 °F) in July.

The Wiesbaden weather station has recorded the following extreme values:

- Highest Temperature 38.9 °C (102.0 °F) on 25 July 2019.
- Lowest Temperature −18.7 °C (−1.7 °F) on 19 December 2009.
- Wettest Year 1,067.3 mm (42.02 in) in 1965.
- Driest Year 473.3 mm (18.63 in) in 1976.
- Highest Daily Precipitation: 71.0 mm (2.80 in) on 7 October 1982.
- Earliest Snowfall: 5 November 1966.
- Latest Snowfall: 15 April 2001.

Climate data for Wiesbaden, 1991–2020 normals, extremes 1960–present (Note: The meteorological station observed from 1960 to 1986 is Wiesbaden-Dotzheim, and the meteorological station observed from 1987 to present is Wiesbaden-Auringen.)
Month	Jan	Feb	Mar	Apr	May	Jun	Jul	Aug	Sep	Oct	Nov	Dec	Year
Record high °C (°F)	14.4 (57.9)	17.3 (63.1)	24.0 (75.2)	28.6 (83.5)	30.8 (87.4)	37.7 (99.9)	38.9 (102.0)	38.3 (100.9)	32.6 (90.7)	25.5 (77.9)	20.5 (68.9)	15.0 (59.0)	38.9 (102.0)
Mean maximum °C (°F)	10.6 (51.1)	12.0 (53.6)	17.5 (63.5)	23.3 (73.9)	27.2 (81.0)	30.5 (86.9)	32.6 (90.7)	31.9 (89.4)	26.3 (79.3)	20.4 (68.7)	14.5 (58.1)	10.9 (51.6)	33.8 (92.8)
Mean daily maximum °C (°F)	3.7 (38.7)	5.2 (41.4)	10.0 (50.0)	15.0 (59.0)	19.0 (66.2)	22.5 (72.5)	24.8 (76.6)	24.5 (76.1)	19.6 (67.3)	13.5 (56.3)	7.7 (45.9)	4.3 (39.7)	14.1 (57.4)
Daily mean °C (°F)	1.2 (34.2)	2.0 (35.6)	5.7 (42.3)	9.9 (49.8)	13.7 (56.7)	16.9 (62.4)	18.9 (66.0)	18.6 (65.5)	14.3 (57.7)	9.6 (49.3)	5.1 (41.2)	2.0 (35.6)	9.8 (49.6)
Mean daily minimum °C (°F)	−1.2 (29.8)	−1.0 (30.2)	1.8 (35.2)	4.9 (40.8)	8.4 (47.1)	11.4 (52.5)	13.5 (56.3)	13.3 (55.9)	9.9 (49.8)	6.2 (43.2)	2.5 (36.5)	−0.3 (31.5)	5.8 (42.4)
Mean minimum °C (°F)	−8.9 (16.0)	−7.4 (18.7)	−4.2 (24.4)	−1.6 (29.1)	1.6 (34.9)	5.9 (42.6)	8.3 (46.9)	7.7 (45.9)	4.8 (40.6)	0.4 (32.7)	−3.2 (26.2)	−7.6 (18.3)	−11.1 (12.0)
Record low °C (°F)	−18.6 (−1.5)	−16.5 (2.3)	−12.7 (9.1)	−5.2 (22.6)	−2.3 (27.9)	1.4 (34.5)	4.8 (40.6)	4.5 (40.1)	1.4 (34.5)	−4.9 (23.2)	−9.8 (14.4)	−18.7 (−1.7)	−18.7 (−1.7)
Average precipitation mm (inches)	66.6 (2.62)	54.0 (2.13)	51.5 (2.03)	42.3 (1.67)	62.8 (2.47)	61.2 (2.41)	76.2 (3.00)	55.0 (2.17)	56.2 (2.21)	60.8 (2.39)	62.3 (2.45)	77.9 (3.07)	726.9 (28.62)
Average extreme snow depth cm (inches)	6.3 (2.5)	5.8 (2.3)	2.8 (1.1)	0.2 (0.1)	0 (0)	0 (0)	0 (0)	0 (0)	0 (0)	0 (0)	2.3 (0.9)	7.7 (3.0)	12.8 (5.0)
Average precipitation days (≥ 0.1 mm)	16.9	15.3	14.6	12.5	13.8	12.5	14.0	13.3	12.2	14.7	16.7	18.8	175.3
Average relative humidity (%)	84.5	80.5	73.6	66.6	68.9	68.9	67.8	69.7	76.0	83.7	87.3	87.4	76.2
Source: Deutscher Wetterdienst/SKlima.de

== History ==
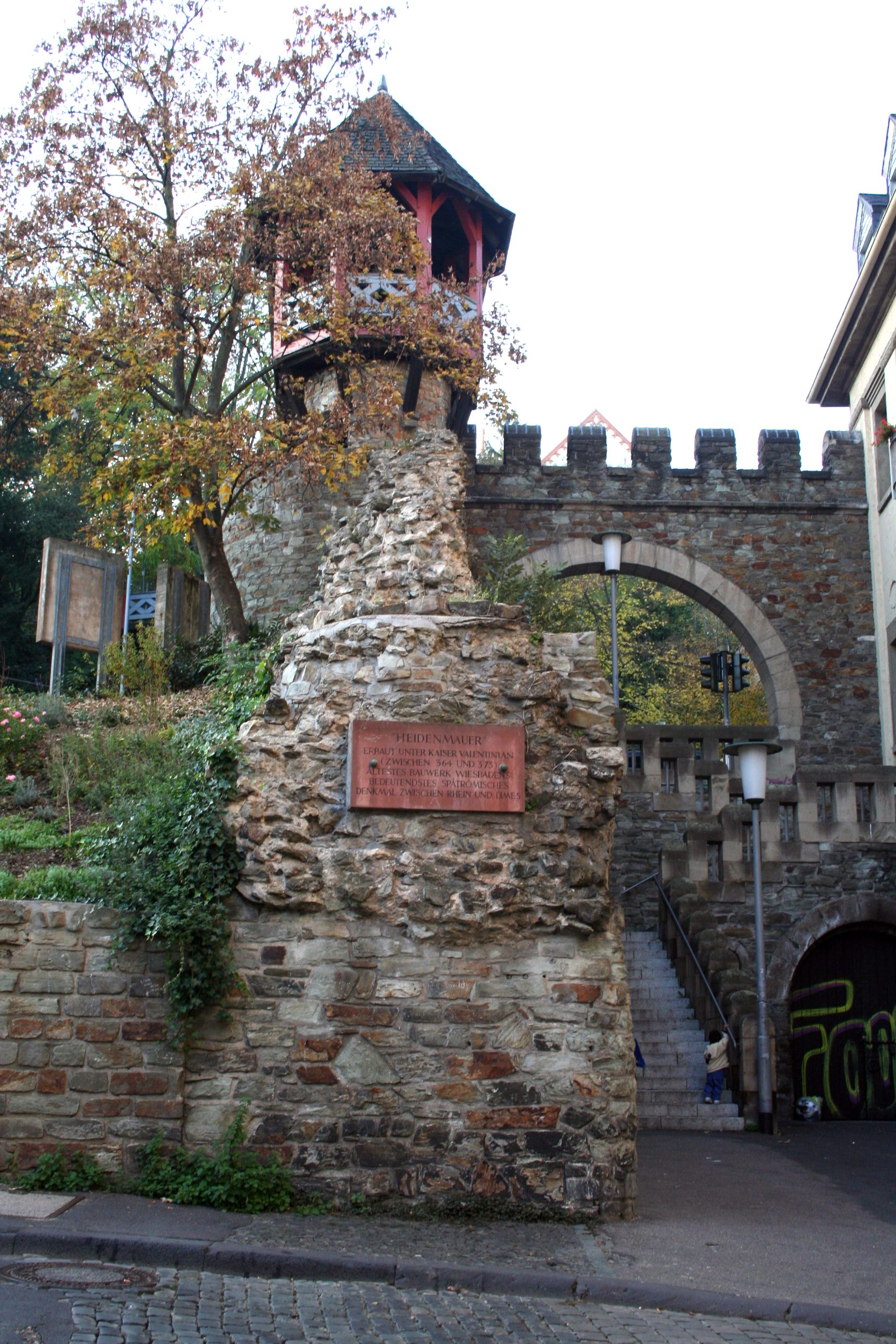
The Heidenmauer ("Heathen Wall") of Aquae Mattiacorum

=== Classical antiquity ===
While evidence of settlement at present-day Wiesbaden dates back to the Neolithic era, historical records document continuous occupancy after the erection of a Roman fort in 6 AD which housed an auxiliary cavalry unit. The thermal springs of Wiesbaden are first mentioned in Pliny the Elder's Naturalis Historia. They were famous for their recreation pools for Roman army horses and possibly as the source of a mineral used for red hair dye (which was very fashionable around the turn of BC/AD among women in Rome).

The Roman settlement is first mentioned using the name Aquae Mattiacorum (Latin for "Waters of the Mattiaci") in 121. The Mattiaci were a Germanic tribe, possibly a branch of the neighboring Chatti, who lived in the vicinity at that time. The town also appears as Mattiacum in Ptolemy's Geographia (2.10). The Roman Empire built the Limes Germanicus, which was a line of Roman frontier fortifications in the Taunus. Wiesbaden is just south of the Taunus.

The capital of the province of Germania Superior, Mogontiacum (present-day Mainz), base of 2 (at times 3) Roman legions, was just over the Rhine and connected by a bridge at the present-day borough of Mainz-Kastel (Roman "castellum"), a strongly fortified bridgehead.

The Alamanni, a coalition of Germanic tribes from beyond the Limes, captured the fort around 260. Later, in the 370s, when the Romans and Alamanni were allied, the Alemanni gained control of the Wiesbaden area and were in charge of its defense against other Germanic tribes.

=== Middle Ages ===
After the Franks under Clovis I defeated the Alamanni in the Battle of Tolbiac in 496, the Franks eventually displaced the Alamanni in the Wiesbaden area over the course of the 6th century. In the 8th century, Wiesbaden became the site of a royal palace of the Frankish kingdom. The first documented use of the name Wiesbaden is by Einhard, the biographer of Charlemagne, whose writings mention "Wisabada" sometime between 828 and 830.

When the Frankish Carolingian Empire broke up in 888, Wiesbaden was in the eastern half, called East Francia (which would evolve into the Holy Roman Empire). The town was part of Franconia, the heartland of East Francia. In the 1170s, the Count of Nassau, Walram I, received the area around Wiesbaden as a fiefdom. When Franconia fragmented in the early 13th century, Nassau emerged as an independent state as part of the Holy Roman Empire.

In 1232 Wiesbaden became a Reichsstadt, an imperial city, of the Holy Roman Empire. However, in 1242, during the war of Emperor Frederick II against the Pope, the Archbishop of Mainz, Siegfried III, ordered the city's destruction.

Wiesbaden returned to the control of the House of Nassau in 1270 under Count Walram II, Count of Nassau. However, Wiesbaden and the castle at Sonnenberg were again destroyed in 1283 in conflict with Eppstein.

Walram's son and successor Adolf would later become king of Germany from 1292 until 1298. In 1329, under Adolf's son Gerlach I of Nassau-Weilburg the House of Nassau and thereby, Wiesbaden, received the right of coinage from Holy Roman Emperor Louis the Bavarian.

In 1355, the County of Nassau-Weilburg was divided among the sons of Gerlach. The County of Nassau's holdings would be subdivided many times among heirs, with the parts being brought together again whenever a line died out. Wiesbaden became the seat of the County of Nassau-Wiesbaden under Count Adolf I (1307–1370), eldest son of Gerlach. It would eventually fall back to Nassau-Weilburg in 1605.

=== Modern era ===
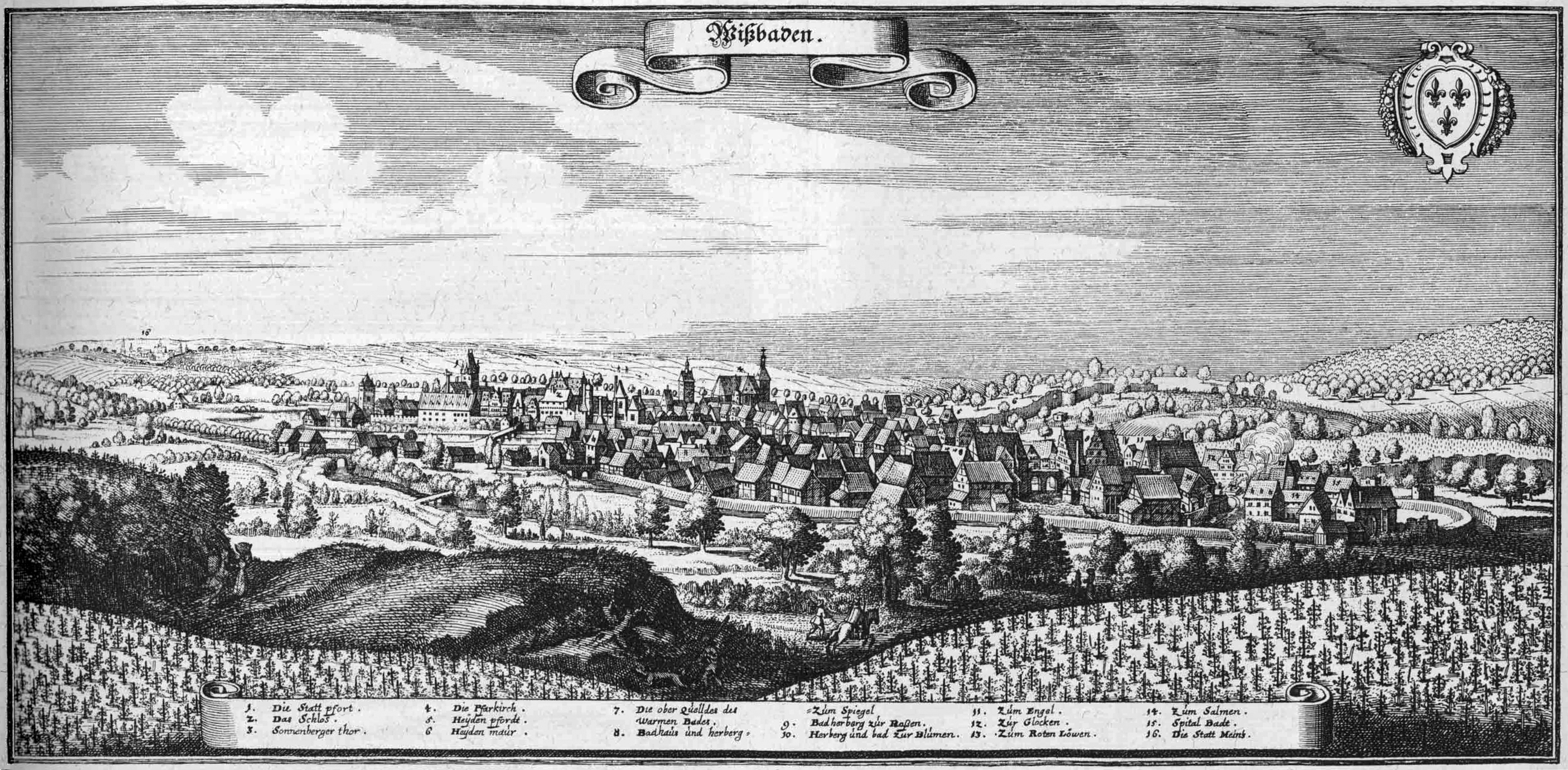
A view of Wiesbaden from the Topographia Hassiae by Matthäus Merian in 1655

Due to its participation in the uprisings of the German Peasants' War of 1525, Wiesbaden lost all its privileges for over 40 years. During this time, Wiesbaden became Protestant with the nomination of Wolf Denthener as first Lutheran pastor on 1 January 1543. The same day, the first Latin school was opened, preparing pupils for the gymnasium in Idstein. In 1566, the privileges of the city were restored.

The oldest remaining building of Wiesbaden, the old city hall, was built in 1609 and 1610. No older buildings are preserved due to two fires in 1547 and 1561. In 1648, at the end of the devastating Thirty Years' War, chronicles tell that Wiesbaden had barely 40 residents left. In 1659, the County of Nassau-Weilburg was divided again. Wiesbaden became part of the County of Nassau-Usingen. In 1744, the seat of Nassau-Usingen was moved to Biebrich. In 1771, the Count of Nassau-Usingen granted a concession for gambling in Wiesbaden. In 1810, the Wiesbaden Casino (German: Spielbank) was opened in the old Kurhaus. Gambling was later outlawed by Prussian authorities in 1872.

As a result of Napoleon's victory over Austria in the Battle of Austerlitz, the Holy Roman Empire was dissolved in 1805. On 12 July 1806, 16 states in present-day Germany, including the remaining counties of Nassau-Usingen and Nassau-Weilburg, formally left the Holy Roman Empire and joined in the Confederation of the Rhine. Napoleon was its "protector". Under pressure from Napoleon, both counties merged to form the Duchy of Nassau on 30 August 1806.

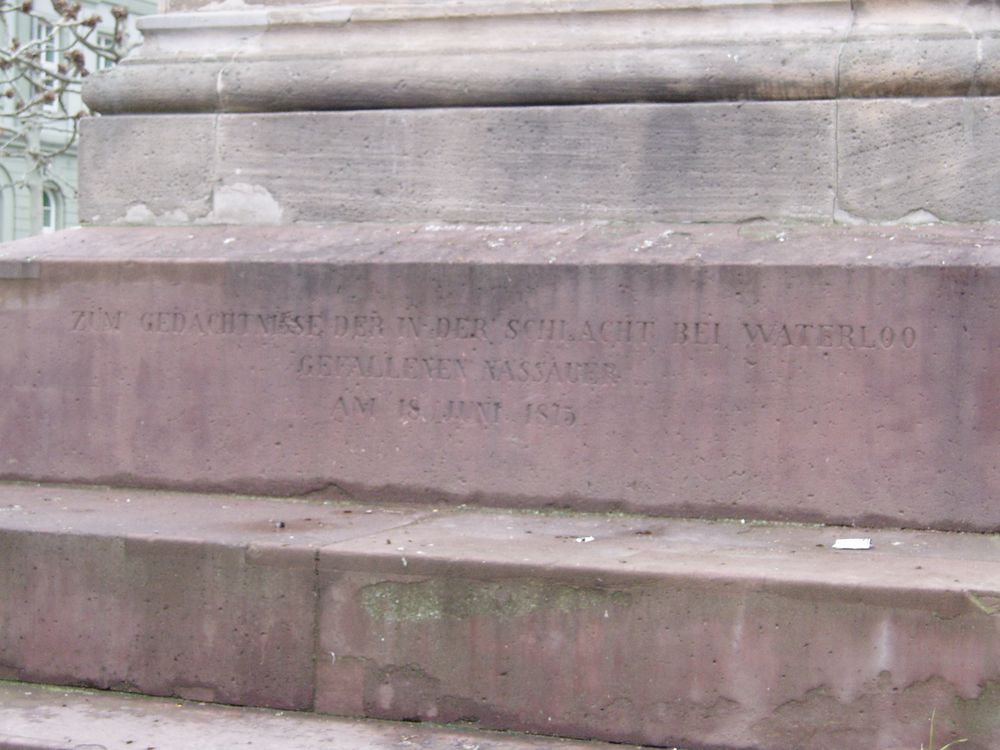
Memorial for Nassauers fallen at the Battle of Waterloo

At the 1815 Congress of Vienna, the Duchy of Nassau joined the German Confederation. The capital of Nassau was moved from Weilburg to Wiesbaden, and the city became the ducal residence. Building activity started to give the city a magnificent appearance. Most of the historical center of Wiesbaden dates back to this time.

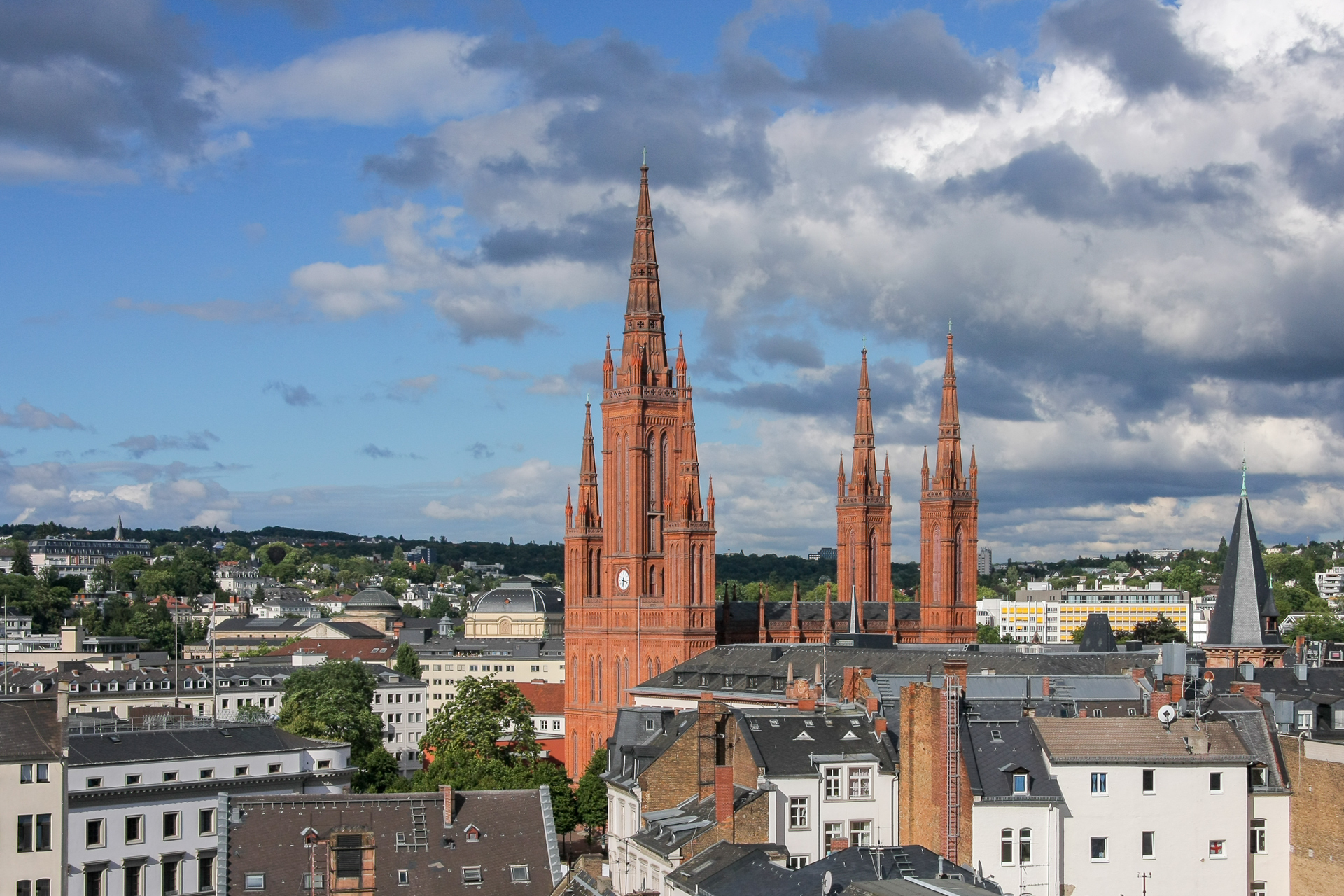
The Marktkirche, designed by Carl Boos: Its neo-Gothic steeple dominates the Historical Pentagon.

In the Revolutions of 1848, 30,000 citizens of Nassau assembled in Wiesbaden on 4 March. They demanded a constitution from the Duke, which they received.

In the Austro-Prussian War of 1866, Nassau took Austria's side. This decision led to the end of the duchy. After the Austrian defeat, Nassau was annexed by Prussia and became part of the Prussian province of Hesse-Nassau. The deposed duke Adolph of Nassau in 1890 became the Grand Duke of Luxembourg (see House of Nassau). This turned out to be a fortunate change for the city, as it then became an international spa town. A rise in construction commenced after the aristocracy followed the lead of the Hohenzollern emperors, who began annual trips to Wiesbaden.

The period around the turn of the 20th century is regarded as the heyday of the city. Kaiser Wilhelm II visited the city regularly in summer, such that it became an unofficial "summer residence". The city was also popular among the Russian nobility. In the wake of the imperial court, numerous nobles, artists, and wealthy businessmen increasingly settled in the city. Many wealthy persons chose Wiesbaden as their retirement seat, as it offered leisure and medical treatment alike. In the latter part of the 19th century, Wiesbaden became the German city with the most millionaires.

In 1894, the present Hessian State Theater, designed by the Vienna architects Fellner and Helmer, was built on behalf of Kaiser Wilhelm II.

=== Weimar Republic and Third Reich (1919 to 1945) ===
After World War I, Wiesbaden fell under the Allied occupation of the Rhineland and was occupied by the French army in 1918. In 1921, the Wiesbaden Agreement on German reparations to France was signed in the city. In 1925, Wiesbaden became the headquarters of the British Army of the Rhine until the withdrawal of occupying forces from the Rhineland in 1930.

In 1929, an airport was constructed in Erbenheim on the site of a horse-racing track. In 1936, Fighter Squadron 53 of the Luftwaffe was stationed here.

In the Kristallnacht pogrom on 10 November 1938, Wiesbaden's large synagogue on Michelsberg was destroyed. The synagogue had been designed by Phillip Hoffmann and built in 1869. Another synagogue in Wiesbaden-Bierstadt was also destroyed. When the Nazis came to power in Germany, there were 2,700 Jews living in Wiesbaden. By June 1942 nearly all of them had been deported to the extermination camps in German-occupied Poland.

General Ludwig Beck from Wiesbaden was one of the planners of the 20 July 1944 assassination attempt of Adolf Hitler. Beck was designated by his fellow conspirators to be future Head of State (Regent) after the elimination of Hitler. The plot failed, however, and Beck was executed after attempting suicide. Today, the city annually awards the Ludwig Beck prize for civil courage in his honor.

Lutheran pastor and theologian Martin Niemöller, founder of the Confessing Church resistance movement against the Nazis, was an Honorary Citizen of Wiesbaden. He presented his last sermon before his arrest in Wiesbaden's Market Church.

=== World War II ===
In World War II, Wiesbaden was the headquarters for Germany's Wehrkreis XII. This military district included the Eifel, part of Hesse, the Palatinate, and the Saarland. After the Battle of France, this Wehrkreis was extended to include Lorraine, including Nancy, and the Grand Duchy of Luxembourg. The commander was General der Infanterie Walther Schroth.

Wehrkreis XII was made up of three subordinate regions: Bereich Hauptsitze Koblenz, Mannheim and Metz.

- Bereich Hauptsitz Koblenz was the headquarters for 12 Unterregion-Hauptsitze, namely Trier I, Trier II, Koblenz, Neuwied, Kreuznach, Wiesbaden, Limburg an der Lahn, Lahn, Mainz, Worms, Darmstadt, and Luxembourg.
- Bereich Hauptsitz Mannheim was the headquarters for 10 Unterregion-Hauptsitze, namely Saarlautern, Saarbrücken, St. Wendel, Zweibrücken, Kaiserslautern, Neustadt an der Weinstraße, Ludwigshafen (Rhein), Mannheim I, Mannheim II, and Heidelberg.
- Bereich Hauptsitz Metz was the headquarters for Unterregion-Hauptsitze Metz, Diedenhofen (Thionville), and Saint-Avold.

During the war, Wiesbaden was, between August 1940 and the end of 1942, bombed by the Royal Air Force and from 1943 through to March 1945, was attacked by both RAF and United States Army Air Force bombers on 66 days. In the attacks, about 18% of the city's homes were destroyed. During the war, more than 25% of the city's buildings were damaged or worse and 1,700 people were killed.

Wiesbaden was the location of a camp for Sinti and Romani people (see Romani Holocaust), and two subcamps of the Hinzert concentration camp, mostly for Luxembourgish prisoners.

Wiesbaden was captured by U.S. Army forces on 28 March 1945. The U.S. 317th Infantry Regiment attacked in assault boats across the Rhine from Mainz while the 319th Infantry attacked across the river Main near Hochheim am Main. The attack started at 01:00 and by early afternoon the two forces of the 80th U.S. Infantry Division had linked up with the loss of only three dead and three missing. The Americans captured 900 German soldiers and a warehouse full of 4,000 cases of champagne.

=== Cold War and contemporary history ===
After World War II, the state of Hesse was established (see Greater Hesse), and Wiesbaden became its capital, though nearby Frankfurt am Main is much larger and works as Hesse's economic and financial centre. Wiesbaden however suffered much less than Frankfurt from air bombing. There is a persistent rumour that the U.S. Army Air Force spared the town with the intention of turning it into a postwar HQ, but USAAF sources claim this to be a myth, arguing that Wiesbaden's economic and strategic importance simply did not justify more bombing. Wiesbaden was host to the Headquarters, U.S. Air Forces, Europe based at the former Lindsey Air Station from 1953 to 1973.

American armed forces have been present in Wiesbaden since World War II. The U.S. 1st Armored Division was headquartered at the Wiesbaden Army Airfield, just off the autobahn toward Frankfurt, until the Division completed relocation to Fort Bliss, Texas, in 2011. Wiesbaden is now home to the U.S. Army Europe Headquarters and the General John Shalikashvili Mission Command Center.

During his military service between 1958-1960 American rock artist Elvis Presley was stationed in Friedberg and often visited Wiesbaden.

In 1962, the American artists George Maciunas, Dick Higgins and Alison Knowles traveled to Europe to promote a planned "Fluxus" publication with concerts of antique musical instruments, the “Fluxus Internationale Festspiele Neuester Music” (Fluxus International Festival of Newest Music) at the Museum Wiesbaden. Fourteen concerts were performed on four weekends between 1 and 23 September which marked the beginning of the Fluxus movement. Work by musicians such as John Cage, György Ligeti, Krzysztof Penderecki, Terry Riley, Brion Gysin and others were performed alongside new performance pieces written by Higgins, Knowles, George Brecht, Nam June Paik, Ben Patterson, Robert Filliou, Emmett Williams, and others. One performance in particular, "Piano Activities" by Philip Corner, became notorious by challenging the important status of the piano in post-war German homes.

== Bathing and gambling ==
Wiesbaden has long been famous for its thermal springs and spa. Use of the thermal springs was first documented by the Romans. The business of spring bathing became important for Wiesbaden near the end of the Middle Ages. By 1370, 16 bath houses were in operation. By 1800, the city had 2,239 inhabitants and 23 bath houses.

By 1900, Wiesbaden, with a population of 86,100, hosted 126,000 visitors annually. Famous visitors to the springs included Johann Wolfgang von Goethe, Fyodor Dostoevsky, Richard Wagner, Johannes Brahms, and Henrik Pontoppidan. In those years, more millionaires were living in Wiesbaden than in any other city in Germany.

Gambling followed bathing en suite, and in the 19th century, Wiesbaden was famous for both. Its casino (Spielbank) rivalled those of Bad Homburg, Baden-Baden, and Monaco. In 1872, the Prussian-dominated imperial government closed down all German gambling houses. The Wiesbaden casino was reopened in 1949.

== Main sights ==
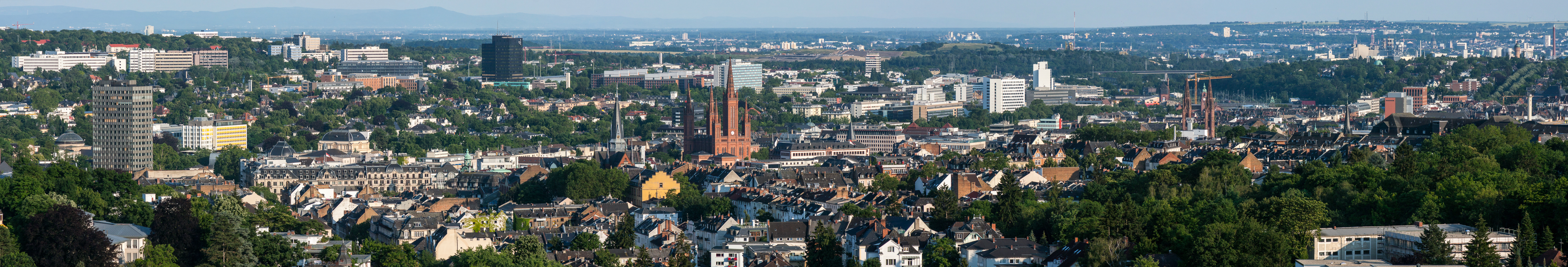
A panorama of Wiesbaden from the Neroberg

=== The Palace Square ===
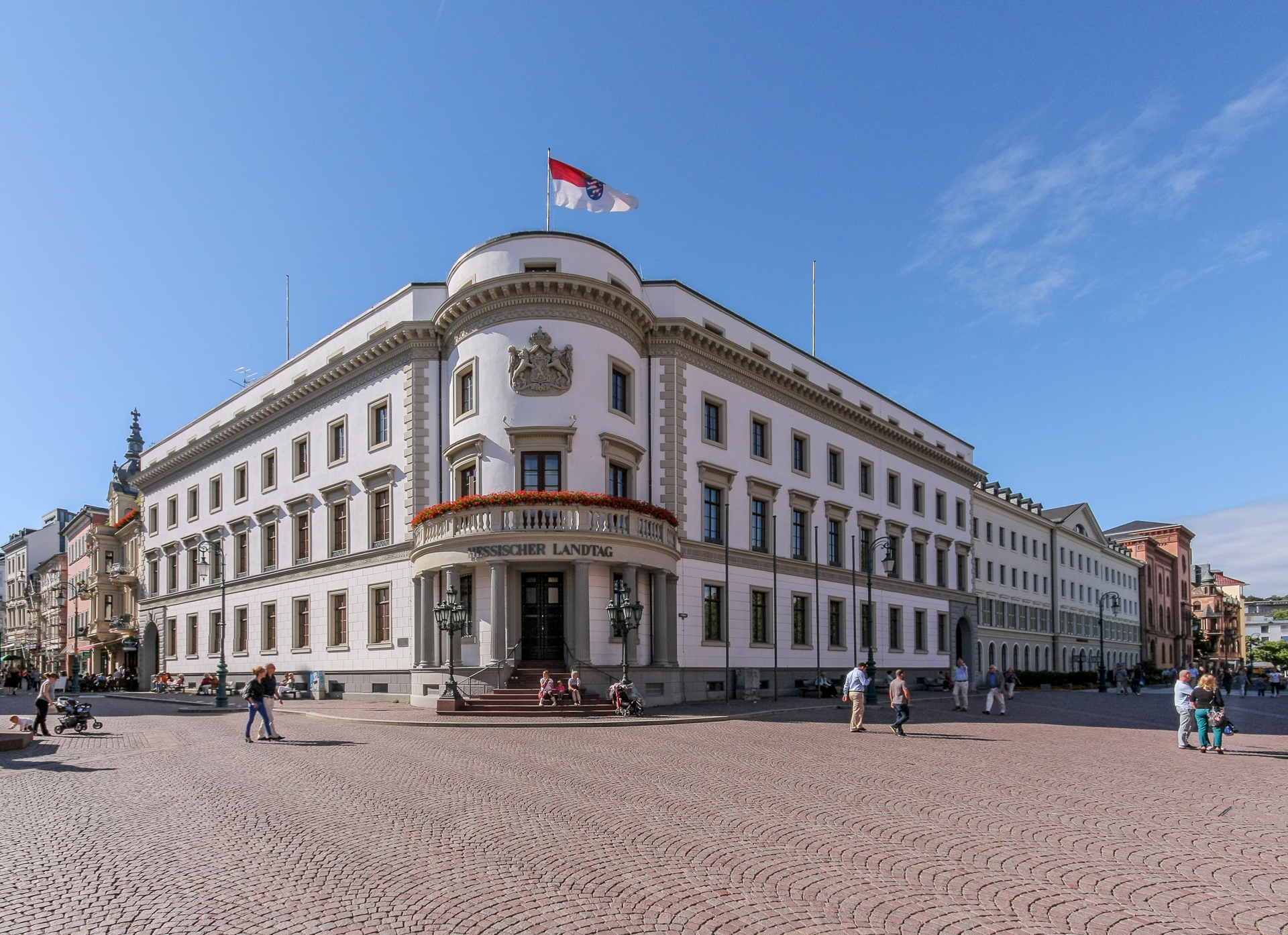
The former Ducal Palace

The Schloßplatz ("palace square") is situated in the center of the city, surrounded by several outstanding buildings. The ducal palace was begun under William, Duke of Nassau. Its foundations were laid in 1837 and it was completed in November 1841 (two years after William's death). For the twenty-six remaining years of ducal authority it was the residence of the ruling family. It later served as a secondary residence for the King of Prussia 1866 to 1918. It was later used as a headquarters for French and British occupying forces after World War I, then as a museum.

Since 1945, the building has served as Landtag (parliamentary building) for the state of Hesse. The site of the palace had been that of a castle, probably from the early Middle Ages, around which the city had developed. While nothing is known of the former castle, remains of it were uncovered during excavations after World War II.

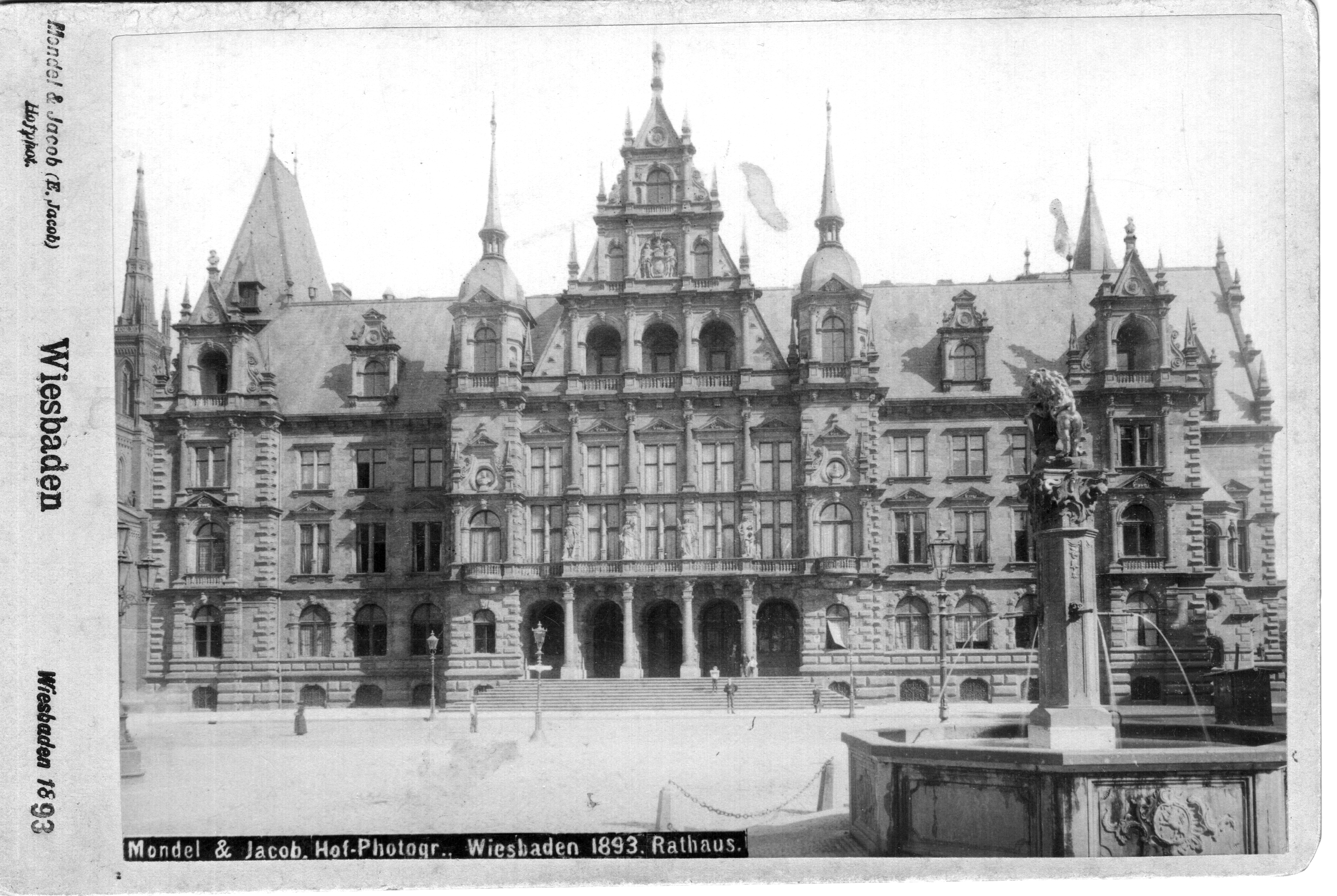
New Town Hall, picture taken 1893

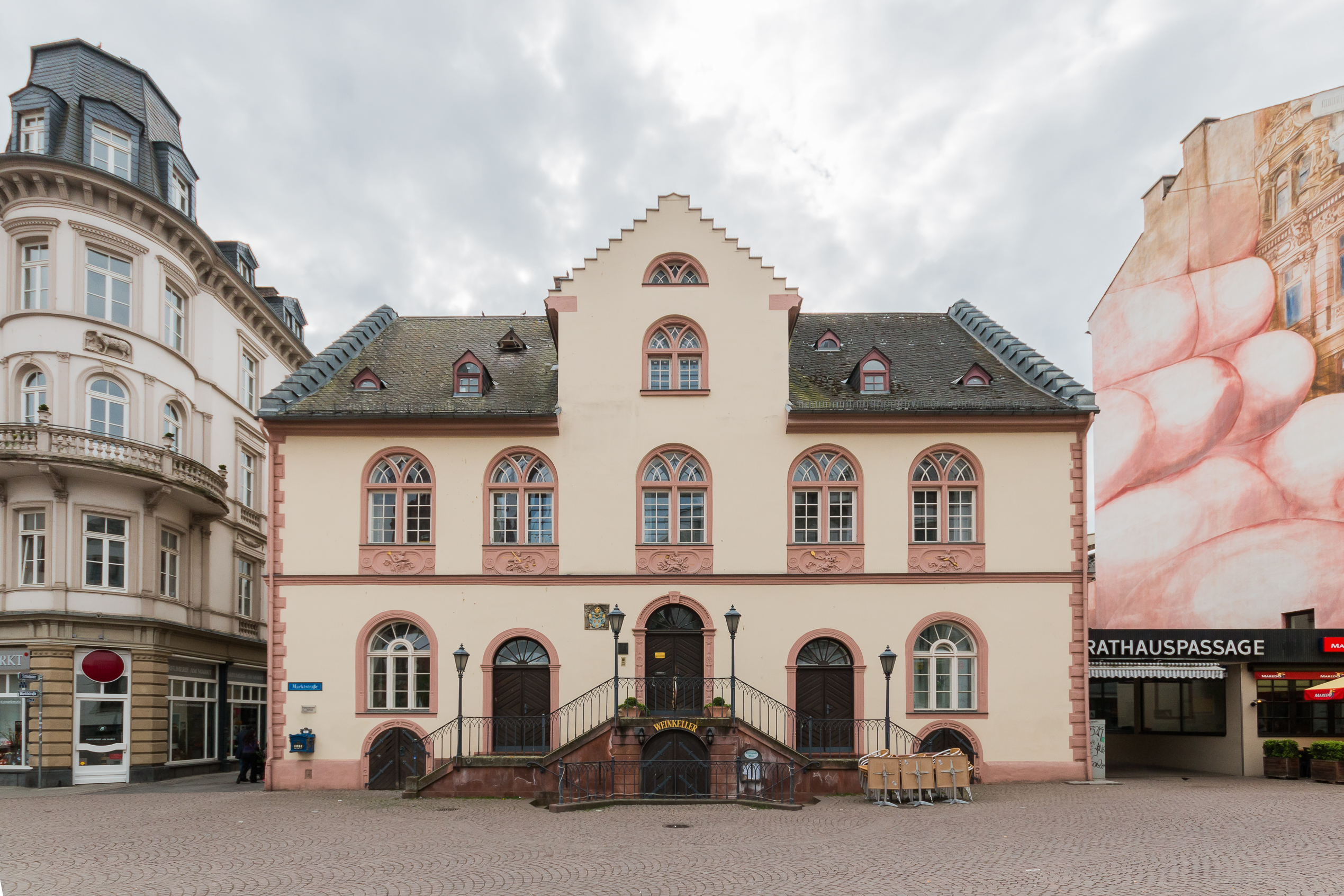
Old Town Hall

The new town hall was built in 1887. A tile mosaic in front of the town hall shows the heraldic eagle of the Kingdom of Prussia (of which Wiesbaden was a part at the time), the coat of arms of the Prussian Province of Hesse-Nassau, and the fleur-de-lis of Wiesbaden. The old town hall, built in 1610, is the oldest preserved building in the city center and now is used as a civil registry office.

The Protestant Marktkirche ("market church") was built from 1852 to 1862 in a neo-Gothic style. Its western steeple is 92 metres (302 feet) in height, making the church the highest building in the city.

=== Kurhaus and Theater ===
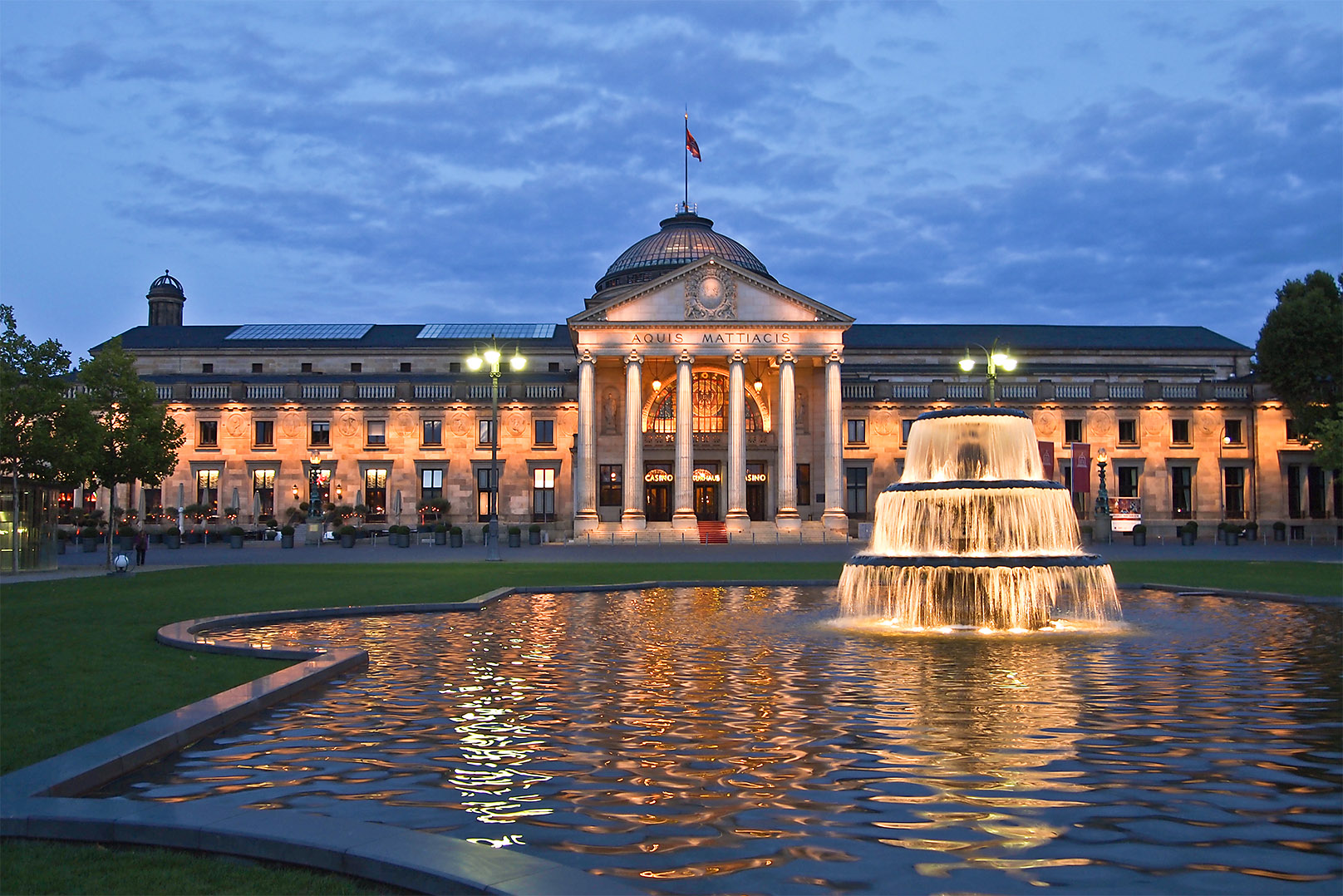
Kurhaus with Fountain on the Bowling Green

The monumental Neo-Classical Kurhaus ("spa house") was built at the request of Kaiser Wilhelm II between 1904 and 1907. Its famous Spielbank (casino) is again in operation.

In front of the Kurhaus is a lawn known as the Bowling Green. To one side of the Bowling Green is the Kurhaus Kolonnade. Built in 1827, the 129 meter structure is the longest hall in Europe supported by pillars. To the other side is the Theater Kolonnade, built in 1839. It is adjacent to the Hessisches Staatstheater Wiesbaden, built between 1892 and 1894.

=== St. Bonifatius ===
St. Bonifatius, the first church for the Catholic community after the Reformation, was built from 1845 until 1849 by Philipp Hoffmann in Gothic Revival style and dedicated to Saint Boniface.

=== St. Elizabeth's Church ===
The Russian Orthodox Church of Saint Elizabeth, called Griechische Kapelle (Greek chapel) locally, was built on the Neroberg from 1847 to 1855 by Duke Adolf of Nassau on the occasion of the early death of his wife Elizabeth Mikhailovna, who died in childbirth. The architect was again Philipp Hoffmann.

=== Museum Wiesbaden ===
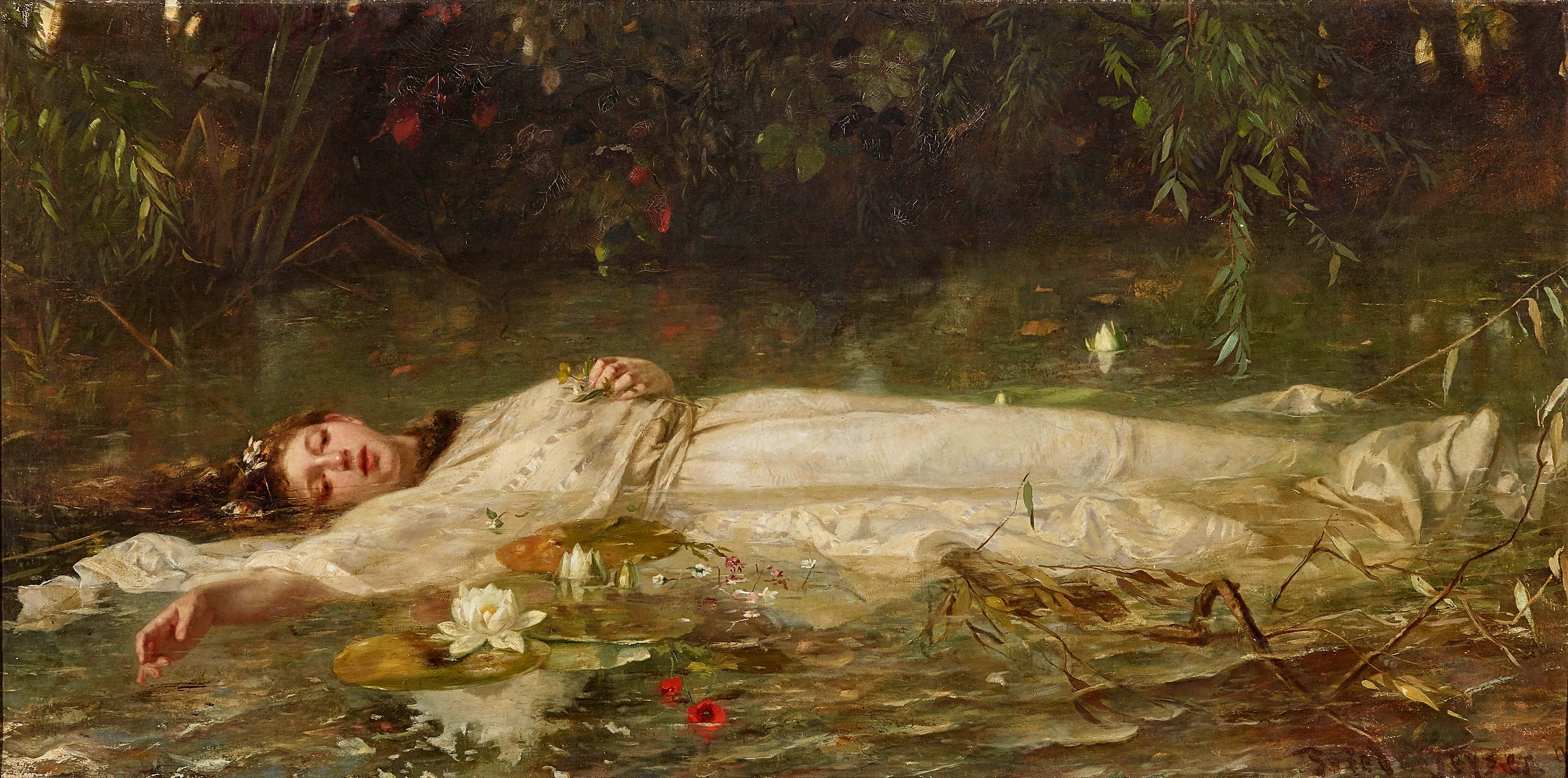
Ophelia was painted c. 1900 by the German artist Friedrich Heyser. The painting was sold at auction in 2017 and acquired by Museum Wiesbaden.

One of the several Hessian state museums, the Museum Wiesbaden is located in Wiesbaden.

=== Warmer Damm park ===
The Warmer Damm park is a 4.5 hectare park on the east side of Wilhelmstrasse and south of the State theater and Kurhaus which features a lake, a fountain, various statues, and large grassy areas. The park was created in 1859-1860 and is named after the medieval fortifications around a pond into which the warm waters of the town's 26 warm springs flowed.

=== Other sights ===
Another building from the regency of Duke Wilhelm is the Luisenplatz, a square named for the Duke's first wife. It is surrounded by Neoclassicist buildings, and in the middle of the square is the Waterloo Obelisk, commemorating the Nassauers who died on 18 June 1815 near Hougoumont Farm in the respective battle against Napoleon. Apart from the palace in the center, the ducal family had a large palace on the banks of the Rhine, known as Schloss Biebrich. This baroque building was erected in the first half of the 18th century.

North of the city is the Neroberg. From the top of this hill it is possible to view a panorama of the city. The Nerobergbahn funicular railway connects the city with the hill. South of it, the Nerotalanlagen are a park along a creek, created in 1897/98 as an English landscape garden.

Other churches are the Bergkirche, completed in 1879 in Gothic Revival style, and the Lutherkirche, finished in 1910 in Jugendstil. The church Mariä Heimsuchung is a tall concrete landmark in the Kohlheck suburb.

Oriental Christianity is also represented with the St. Isaiah Syriac Orthodox Church on the Willi-Juppe-Straße in Dotzheim, built in 2016 by Assyrians. Although the majority of Assyrians in Wiesbaden are Syriac Orthodox, the Assyrian Church of the East also has a congregation located in the city.

== Gallery ==
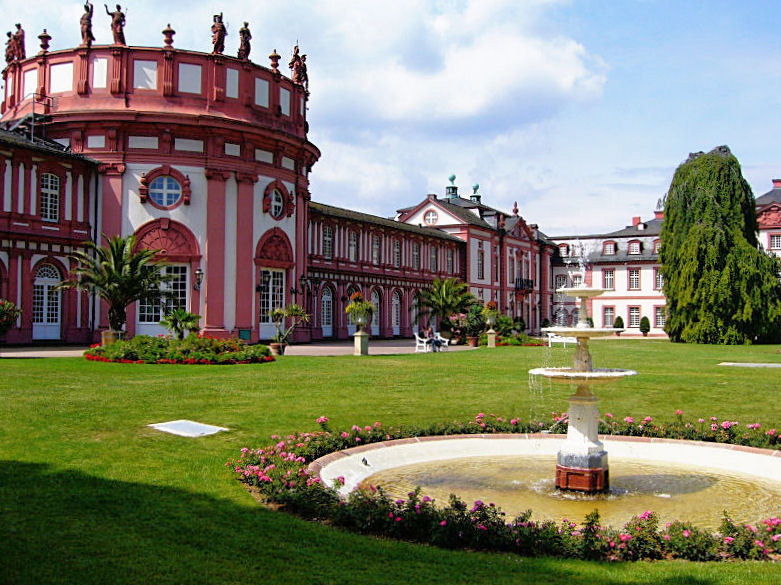
Biebrich Palace

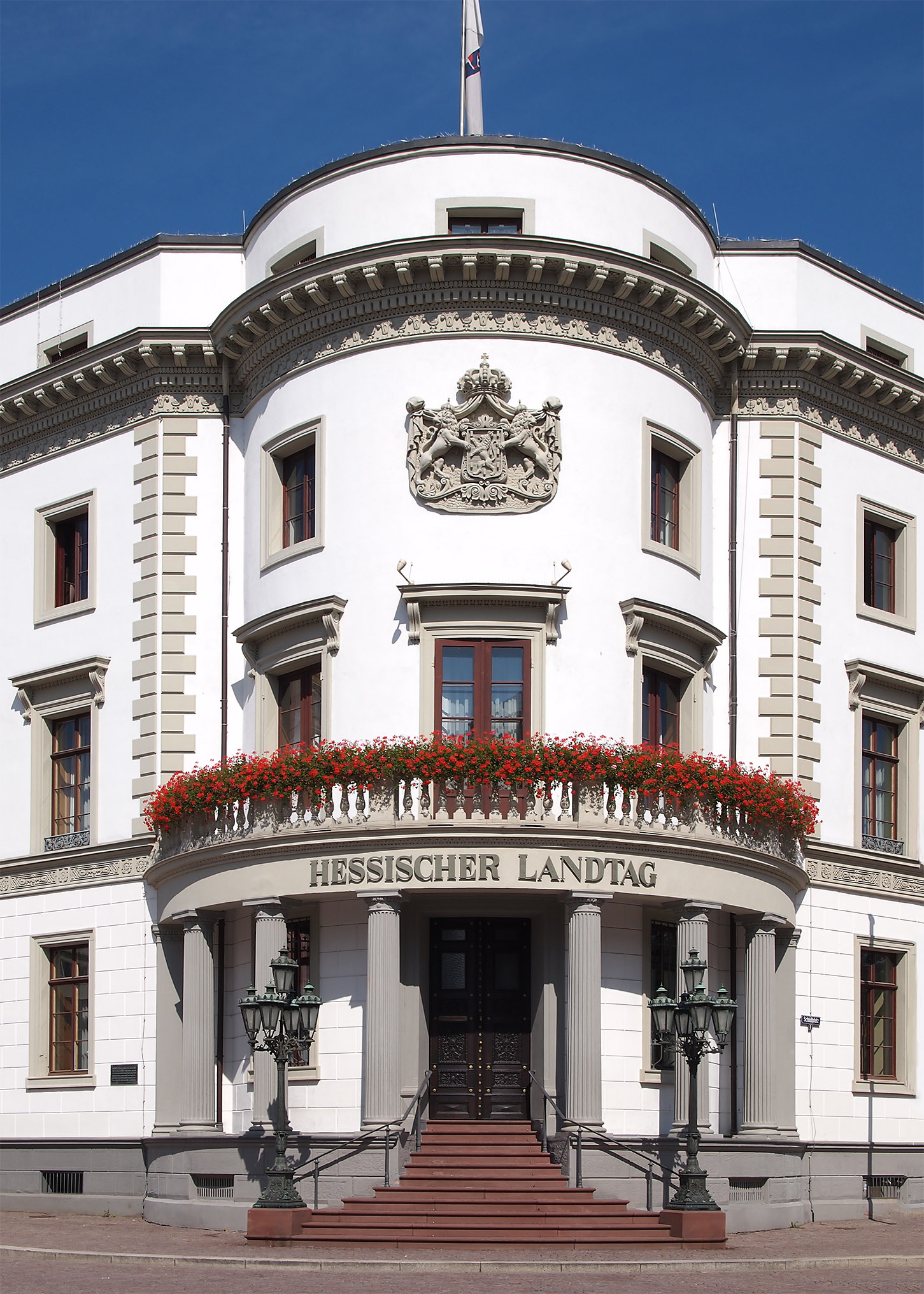
City Palace

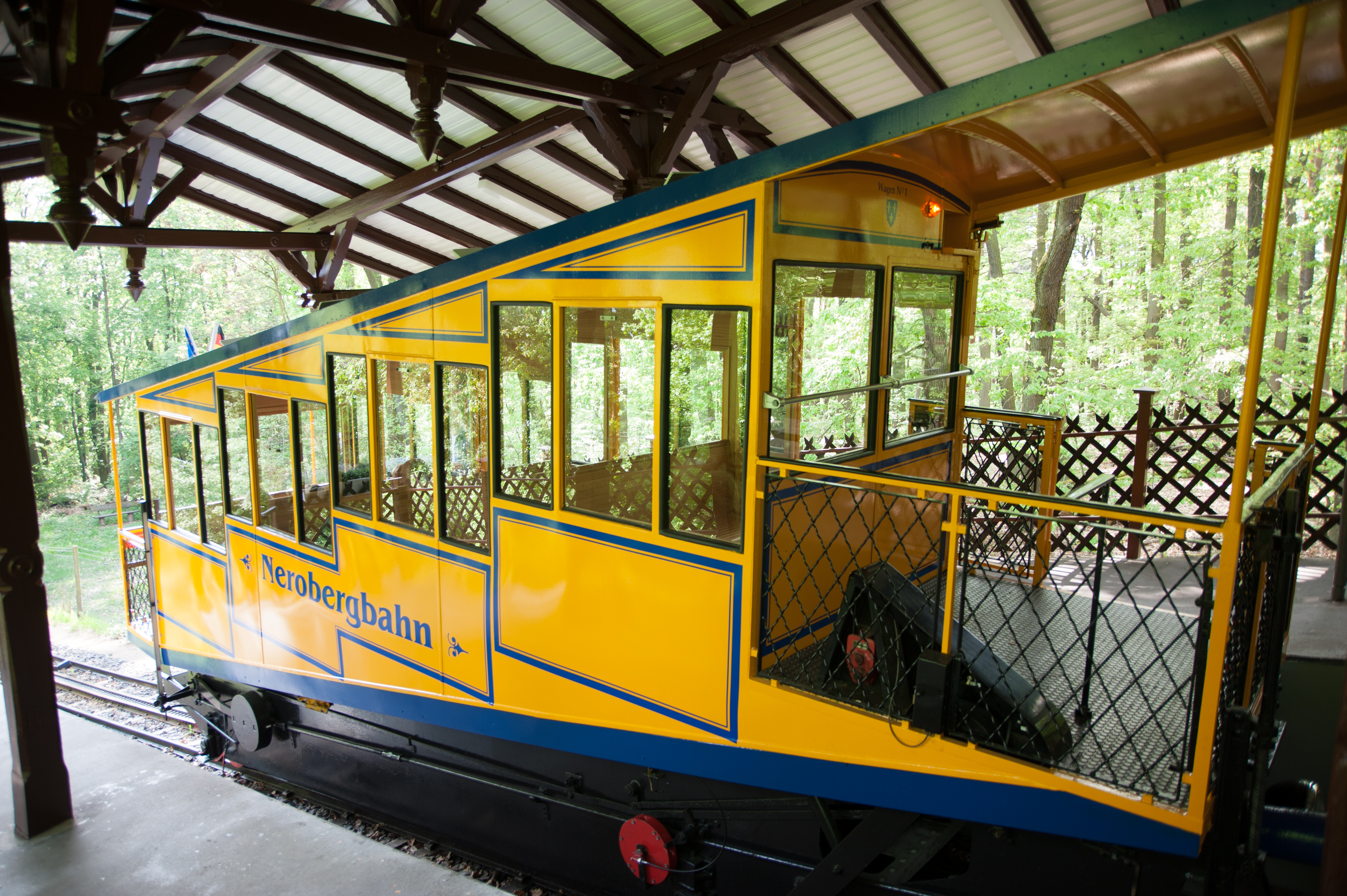
Nerobergbahn funicular

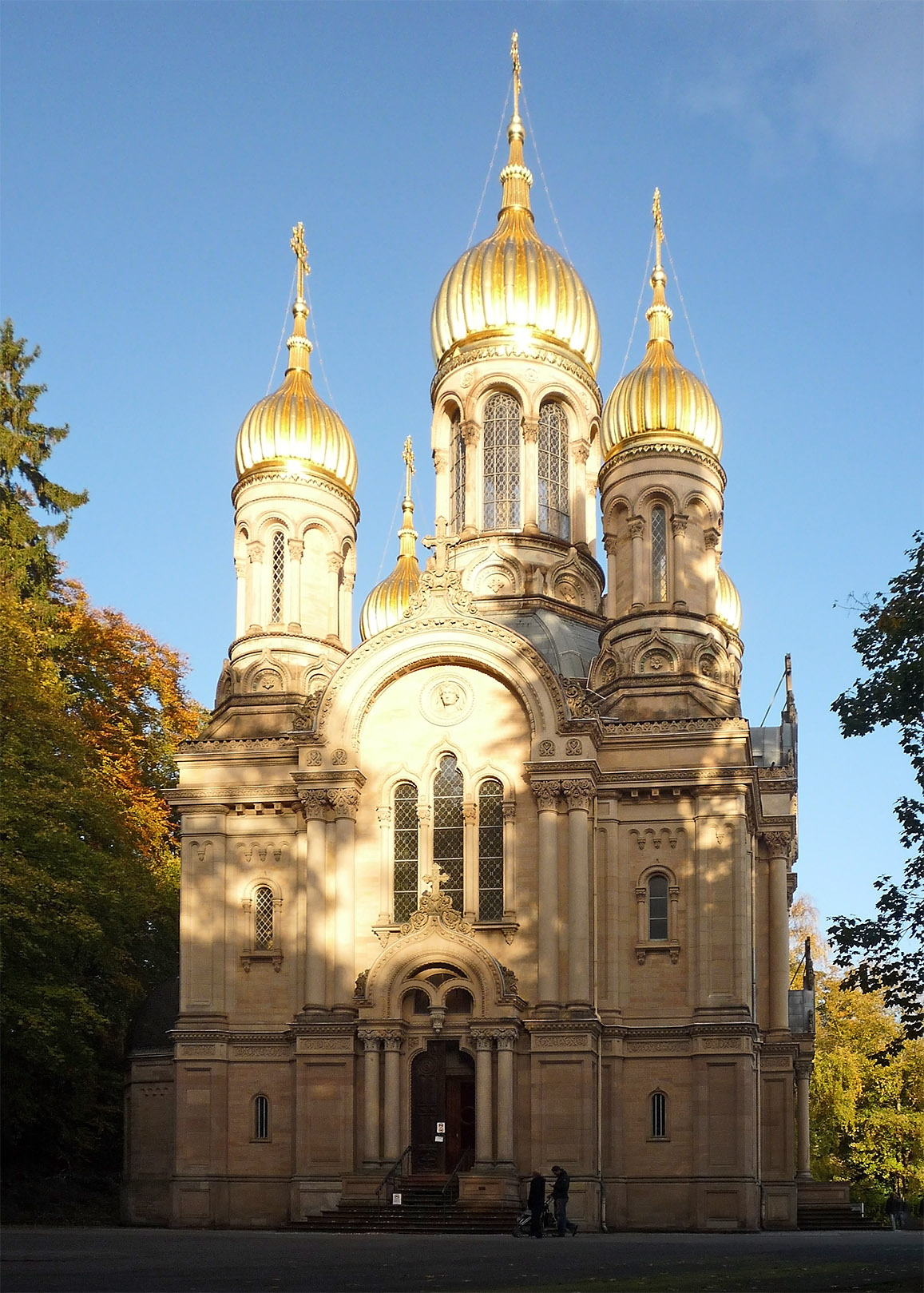
Griechische Kapelle

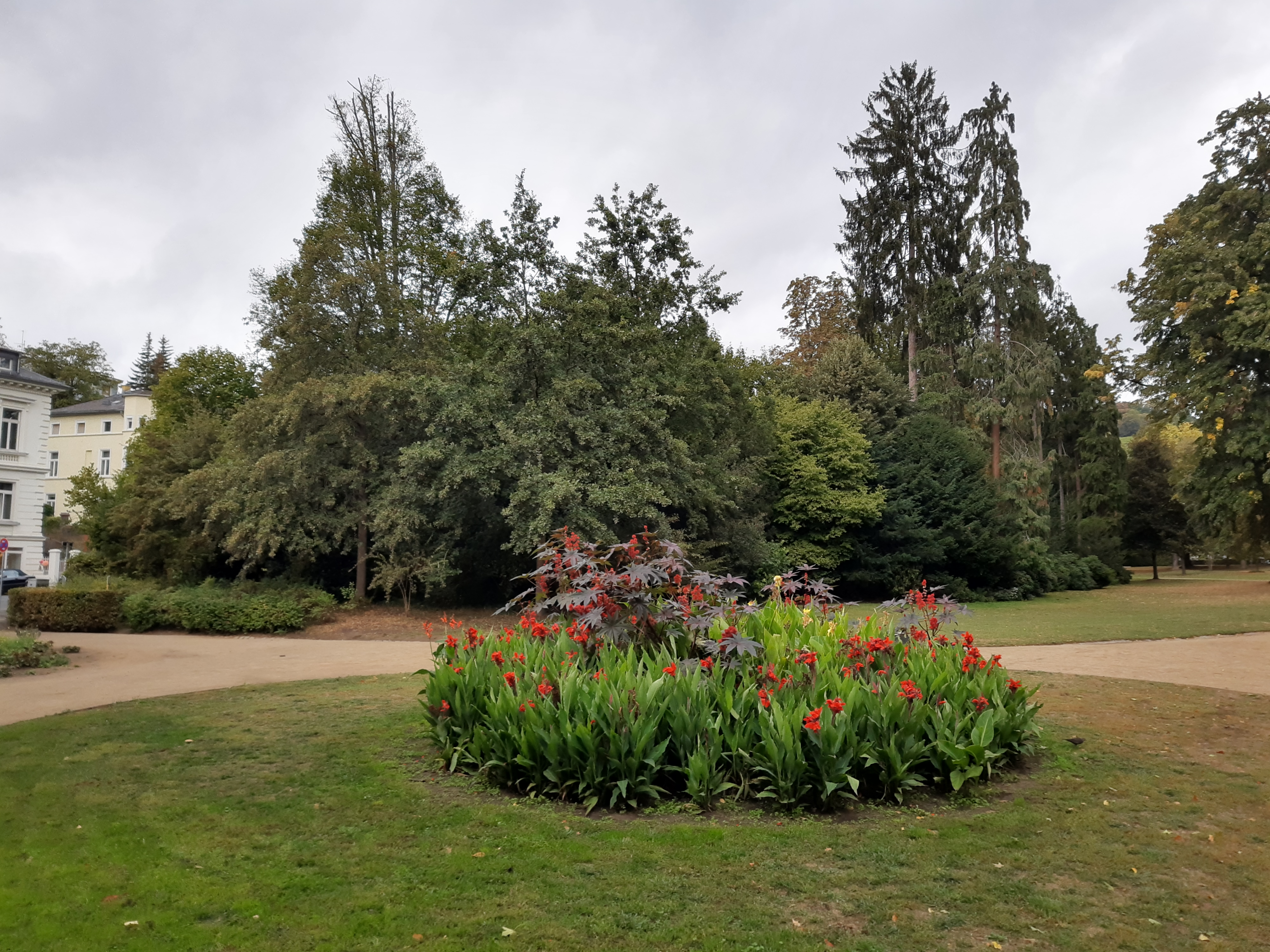
Nerotalanlagen

Marktkirche

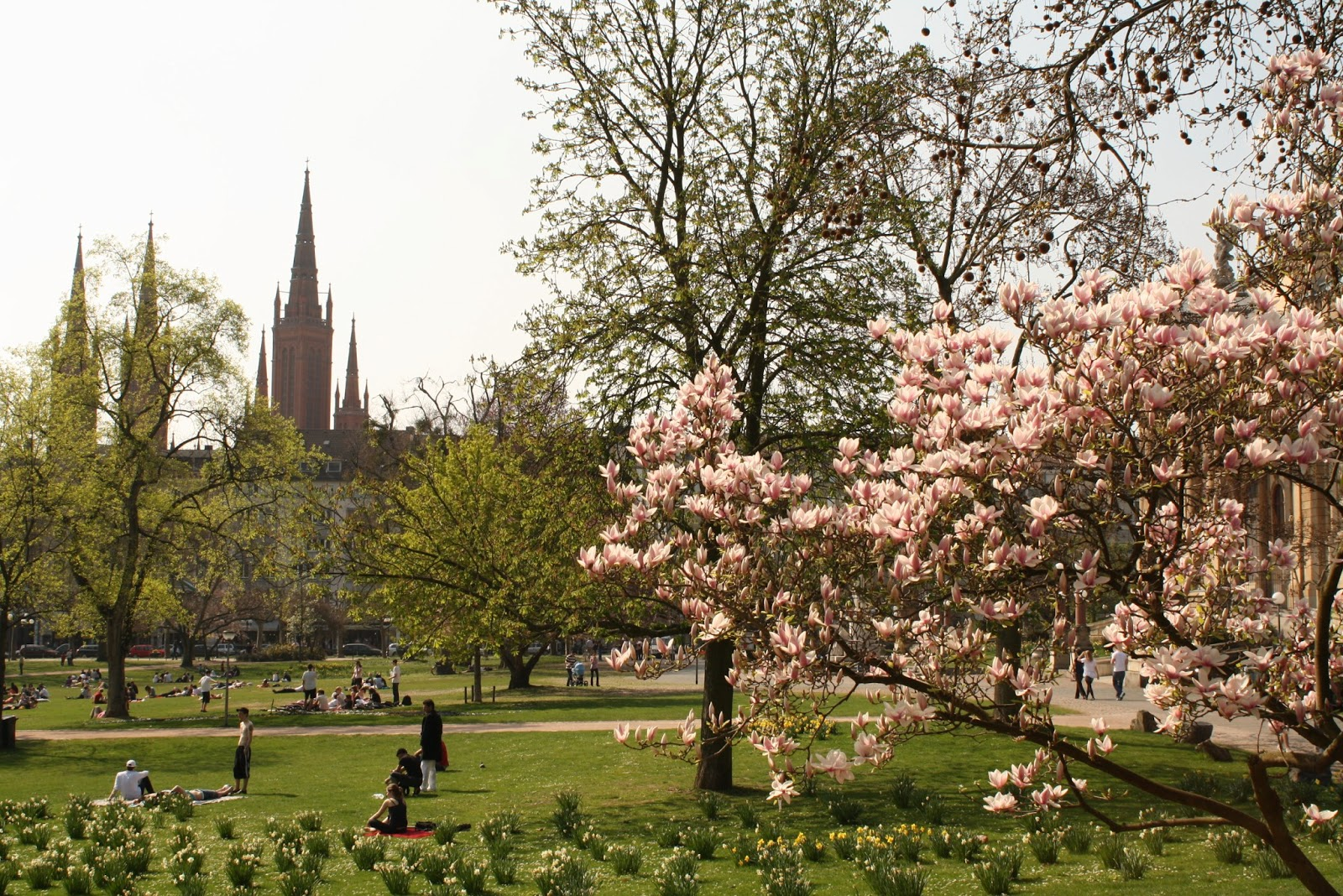
Warmer Damm

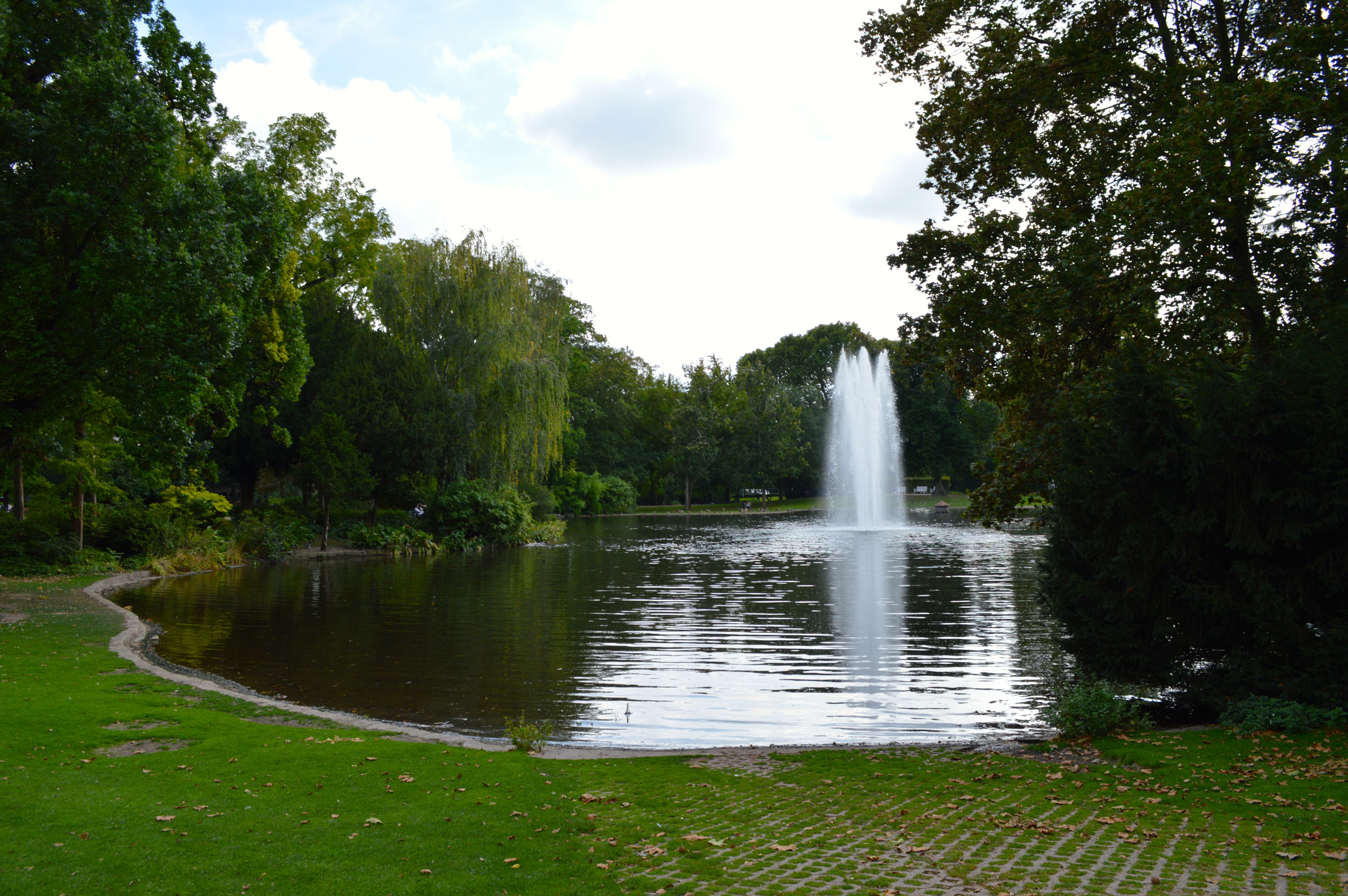
Warmer Damm

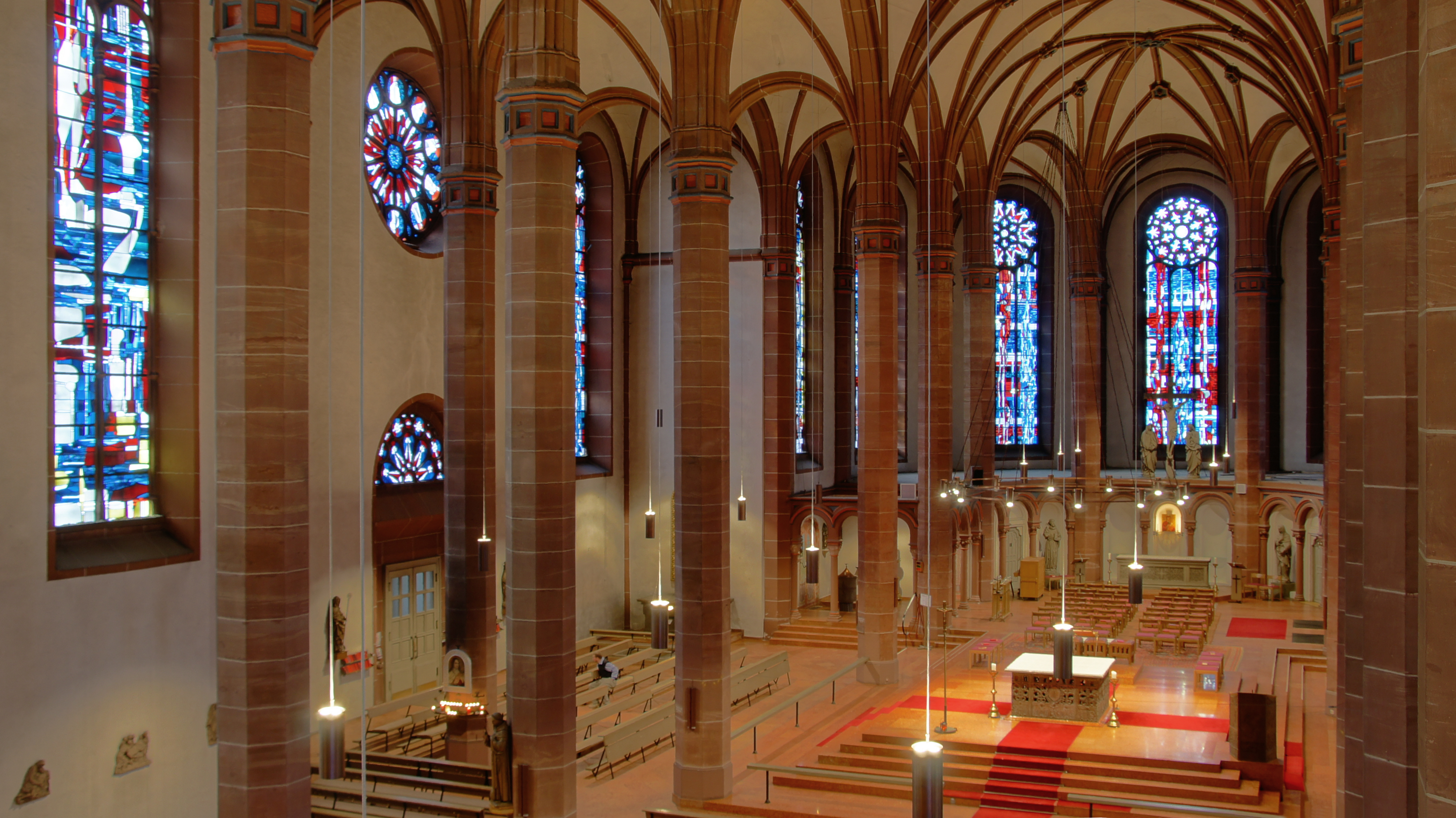
St. Bonifatius

== Boroughs of Wiesbaden ==
The city of Wiesbaden is divided into 26 boroughs: five in the central city and 21 suburban districts. The 21 suburban districts were incorporated in four phases from 1926 to 1977. The former Mainz suburbs on the right bank of river Rhine viz. Amöneburg, Kastel and Kostheim have belonged to Wiesbaden since 1945.

Boroughs of Wiesbaden

=== Inner boroughs ===
Borough	Area	Population	Density	Purchasing power per inhabitant	Map
Mitte	1.53 km^{2}	20,797	13,593	€19,707	
Nordost	19.44 km^{2}	22,621	1,163	€21,709	
Rheingauviertel	2.47 km^{2}	19,802	8,017	€17,461	
Südost	6.62 km^{2}	18,835	2,845	€24,370	
Westend	0.67 km^{2}	16,528	24,669	€19,047	

=== Suburban boroughs ===
Borough	Area	Population	Density	Purchasing power per inh.	Incorporated since	Map
Auringen	3.12 km^{2}	3,399	1,079	€22,114	1 January 1977	
Biebrich	12.99 km^{2}	36,896	2,840	€18,779	28 October 1926	
Bierstadt	9.22 km^{2}	12,109	1,313	€22,807	1 April 1928	
Breckenheim	6.53 km^{2}	3,375	517	€22,074	1 January 1977	
Delkenheim	7.43 km^{2}	4,938	665	€20,908	1 January 1977	
Dotzheim	18.27 km^{2}	26,234	1,436	€18,793	1 April 1928	
Erbenheim	11.27 km^{2}	9,258	821	€19,357	1 April 1928	
Frauenstein	10.65 km^{2}	2,359	222	€19,365	1 April 1928	
Heßloch	1.54 km^{2}	695	451	€24,525	1 April 1928	
Igstadt	7.26 km^{2}	2,090	288	€21,869	1 April 1928	
Klarenthal	6.13 km^{2}	10,280	1,677	€18,103	1 September 1964	
Kloppenheim	5.39 km^{2}	2,301	427	€21,592	1 April 1928	
Mainz-Amöneburg	3.71 km^{2}	1,444	389	€17,267	25 July 1945	
Mainz-Kastel	9.51 km^{2}	12,021	1,264	€19,874	25 July 1945	
Mainz-Kostheim	9.53 km^{2}	13,935	1,462	€18,623	25 July 1945	
Medenbach	4.74 km^{2}	2,501	560	€21,170	1 January 1977	
Naurod	10.99 km^{2}	4,414	402	€21,865	1 January 1977	
Nordenstadt	7.73 km^{2}	7,896	1,021	€21,503	1 January 1977	
Rambach	9.92 km^{2}	2,175	219	€24,902	1 April 1928	
Schierstein	9.43 km^{2}	10,129	1,074	€19,938	28 October 1926	
Sonnenberg	8.34 km^{2}	7,972	956	€27,701	28 October 1926	

== Population ==
Population development since 1524

Historical population
Year	Pop.	±%
1521	192	—
1699	730	+280.2%
1722	1,329	+82.1%
1800	2,239	+68.5%
1840	11,648	+420.2%
1861	20,800	+78.6%
1871	35,500	+70.7%
1880	50,238	+41.5%
1890	64,670	+28.7%
1900	86,111	+33.2%
1905	100,953	+17.2%
1910	109,002	+8.0%
1917	86,555	−20.6%
1925	102,737	+18.7%
1933	159,755	+55.5%
1939	170,354	+6.6%
1946	188,370	+10.6%
1950	220,741	+17.2%
1956	244,994	+11.0%
1961	253,280	+3.4%
1965	260,331	+2.8%
1970	250,122	−3.9%
1980	274,464	+9.7%
1987	251,871	−8.2%
1990	260,301	+3.3%
2001	271,076	+4.1%
2011	269,121	−0.7%
2022	284,260	+5.6%
Population size may be affected by changes in administrative divisions.

Wiesbaden has a population of about 280,000. In 1946, when Wiesbaden became the capital of Hesse state, it had a population of about 188,000. At that time, Wiesbaden was a part of American occupied zone and parts of the city of Mainz, which was the right side on the Rhine river, became a part of Wiesbaden. In 1950s many Americans came to Wiesbaden due to its jobs by military bases. Many people who work in Frankfurt live in Wiesbaden due to its high rent of the city. Wiesbaden is one of the most international cities in Germany with people from over 180 countries.

List of largest groups of foreign residents of Wiesbaden:

Rank	Nationality	Population (2022)
1	Turkey	9,351
2	Poland	4,648
3	Italy	4,089
4	Ukraine	3,678
5	Romania	3,265
6	Bulgaria	2,843
7	Greece	2,774
8	Syria	2,495
9	Croatia	1,947
10	Serbia	1,815
11	Morocco	1,801
12	Spain	1,523
13	USA	1,333
14	Afghanistan	1,245
15	Portugal	1,240
16	Russia	1,143
17	Bosnia and Herzegovina	1,138
18	Iran	820
19	France	774
20	Austria	713

== Politics ==
=== Mayor ===
Results of the second round of the 2019 mayoral election

The current mayor of Wiesbaden is Gert-Uwe Mende of the Social Democratic Party (SPD), who was elected in 2019.

The most recent mayoral election was held on 26 May 2019, with a runoff held on 16 June, and the results were as follows:

Candidate	Party	First round		Second round	
Candidate	Party	Votes	%	Votes	%
Gert-Uwe Mende	Social Democratic Party	29,940	27.1	41,000	62.0
Eberhard Seidensticker	Christian Democratic Union	26,997	24.5	25,104	38.0
Christiane Hinninger	Alliance 90/The Greens	25,849	23.4		
Sebastian Rutten	Free Democratic Party	11,590	10.5		
Eckhard Müller	Alternative for Germany	6,859	6.2		
Ingo von Seemen	The Left	5,336	4.8		
Christian Bachmann	Free Voters	3,812	3.5		
Valid votes		110,383	98.9	66,104	98.6
Invalid votes		1,202	1.1	937	1.4
Total		111,585	100.0	67,041	100.0
Electorate/voter turnout		208,686	53.5	208,821	32.1
Source: City of Wiesbaden (1st round, 2nd round)

The following is a list of mayors since 1849: (Note: The information up to 2007 was retrieved from Die Wiesbadener Oberbürgermeister seit dem Bau des neuen Rathauses (1886) (The Wiesbaden Mayors since the construction of the new town mayor hall (1886)).)

- 1849–1868: Heinrich Fischer
- 1868–1882: Wilhelm Lanz
- 1882–1883: Christian Schlichter
- 1883–1913: Carl Bernhard von Ibell
- 1913–1919: Karl Glässing
- 1919–1929: Fritz Travers
- 1930–1933: Georg Krücke
- 1933–1937: Alfred Schulte
- 1937–1945: Erich Mix
- 1945–1946: Georg Krücke
- 1946–1953: Hans Heinrich Redlhammer
- 1951–1954: Georg Kluge
- 1954–1960: Erich Mix
- 1960–1968: Georg Buch
- 1968–1980: Rudi Schmitt
- 1980–1982: Georg-Berndt Oschatz
- 1982–1985: Hans-Joachim Jentsch
- 1985–1997: Achim Exner
- 1997–2007: Hildebrand Diehl
- 2007–2013: Helmut Müller
- 2013–2019: Sven Gerich
- 2019– : Gert-Uwe Mende

=== City council ===
Results of 2021 city council election

The administrative structure of Wiesbaden is based on the Hessian municipal code, as last amended in 2006. The Wiesbaden City Council (Stadtverordnetenversammlung) governs the city alongside the Mayor. The most recent city council election was held on 14 March 2021. Following the election, the coalition negotiations resulted in an agreement between Alliance 90/The Greens (Grüne), the Social Democratic Party (SPD), The Left, and Volt Germany. These 42 votes allowed the Greens, who came second in the popular vote, to keep the CDU, who had come in first, out of the governing majority. The full results of the election were as follows:

Party	Lead candidate	Votes	%	+/−	Seats	+/−
Christian Democratic Union (CDU)	Daniela Georgi	1,526,381	23.5	▼1.2	19	▼1
Alliance 90/The Greens (Grüne)	Christiane Hinninger	1,390,605	21.4	▲7.3	17	▲6
Social Democratic Party (SPD)	Hendrik Schmehl	1,320,299	20.3	▼5.6	17	▼4
Free Democratic Party (FDP)	Christian Diers	675,021	10.4	▲0.6	8	±0
Alternative for Germany (AfD)	Eckhard Müller	423,519	6.5	▼6.3	5	▼6
The Left (Die Linke)	Ingo von Seemen	402,735	6.2	0.0	5	±0
Volt Germany (Volt)	Daniel Weber	246,454	3.8	New	3	New
Free Voters (FW)	Christian Bachmann	163,942	2.5	▲1.1	2	▲1
Initiative Pro Auto Wiesbaden (Pro Auto)	Christian Hill	105,047	1.6	New	1	New
Citizens' List Wiesbaden (BLW)	Monika Becht	73,255	1.1	▼0.6	1	±0
Die PARTEI (PARTEI)	Lukas Haker	51,343	0.8	New	1	New
Independent List Wiesbaden (ULW)	Veit Wilhelmy	50,920	0.8	▼0.2	1	±0
Alliance for Innovation and Justice (BIG)	Faissal Wardak	44,344	0.7	▲0.4	1	▲1
Liberal Conservative Reformers (LKR)	Thomas Preinl	25,988	0.4	New	0	New
Valid votes		83,885	95.9			
Invalid votes		3,597	4.1			
Total		87,482	100.0		81	±0
Electorate/voter turnout		209,347	41.8	▼1.6		
Source: City Council Vote, Wiesbaden

== Transport ==
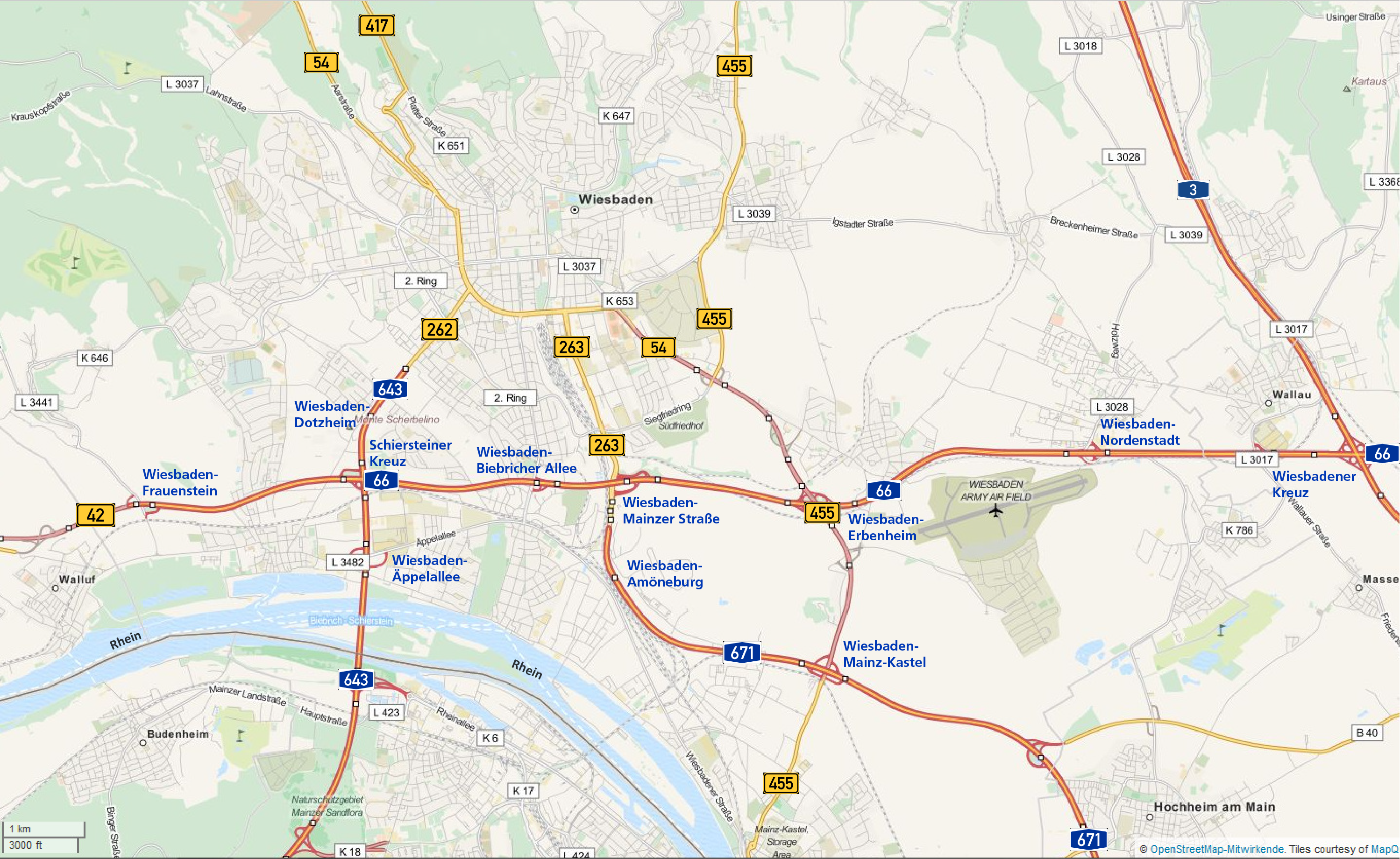
A map of Wiesbaden with Autobahns, federal roads and main streets

=== Roads ===
Wiesbaden is well connected to the German motorway (Autobahn) system. The Wiesbadener Kreuz is an Autobahn interchange east of the city where the Bundesautobahn 3 (A 3), Cologne to Würzburg, and the Bundesautobahn 66 (A 66), Rheingau to Fulda, meet. With approximately 210,000 cars daily it is one of the most heavily used interchange in Germany. The Bundesautobahn 66 (A 66) connects Wiesbaden with Frankfurt.

The Bundesautobahn 643 (A 643) is mainly a commuter motorway which starts in the south of the city centre, runs through the southern part of Wiesbaden crosses the Rhine via the Schierstein Bridge and connect in the northwestern part of Mainz to the A60. The Bundesautobahn 671 (A 671) is a very short motorway in the southeastern part of Wiesbaden which primarily serves as a fast connection between the city centre and the Bundesautobahn 60 to serve the cities like Rüsselsheim, Darmstadt and the Rhine-Neckar region (Mannheim, Ludwigshafen and Heidelberg).

The downtown area is bordered on the north side by Taunusstrasse, which has once featured many antique stores. The east side is constrained by Wilhelmstrasse, created by Christian Zais. This 1,000 meter-long street is named after Duke William of Nassau (German Wilhelm), not Emperor Wilhelm II, as many mistakenly believe.

The streets of central Wiesbaden are regularly congested with cars during rush hour. Besides some areas, especially the Ringroad and not directly in the centre, and the southern arterial roads like the Mainzer Straße, Biebricher Allee and Schiersteiner Straße.

=== Rail ===
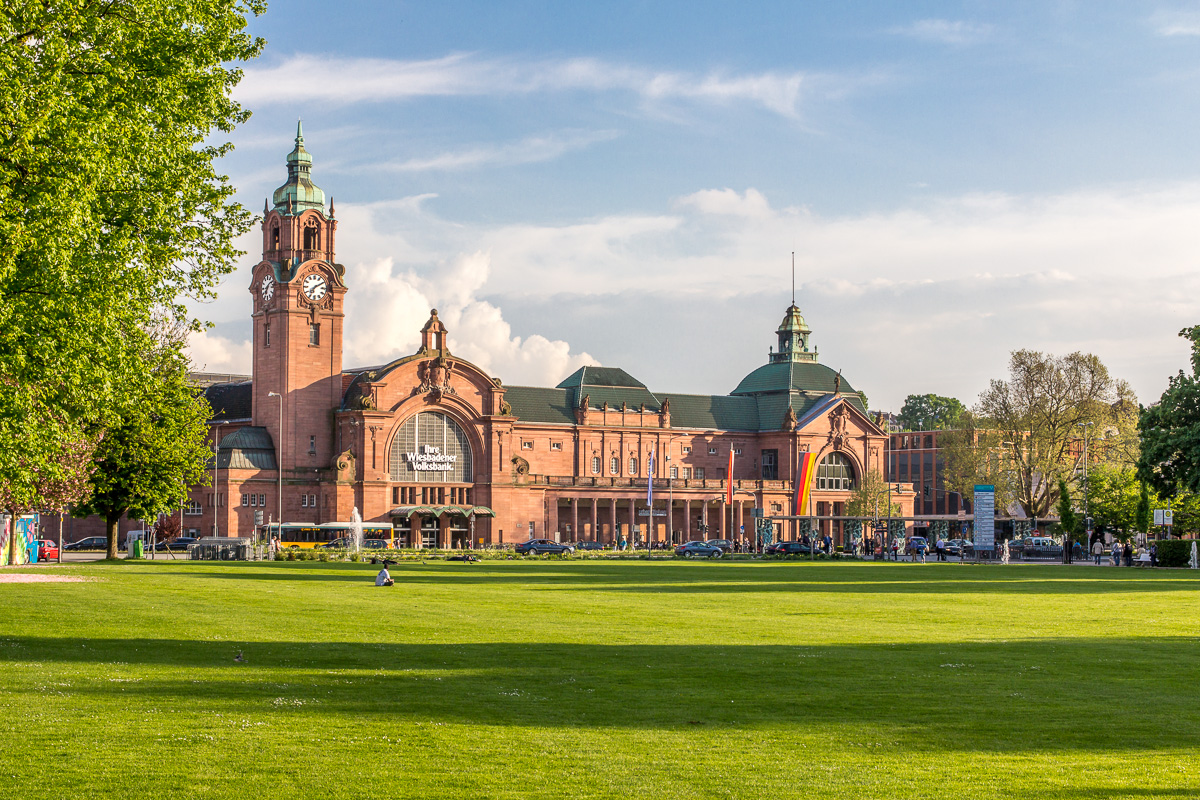
Wiesbaden main station, built between 1904 and 1906

Wiesbaden's main railway station and several minor railway stops connect the town with Frankfurt, Darmstadt, Mainz, Limburg, and Koblenz via Rüdesheim. Wiesbaden Hauptbahnhof is connected to the Cologne-Frankfurt high-speed rail line by a 13-kilometer branch line. Hamburg, München, Leipzig, Dresden, Stuttgart, Mannheim, and Hanover are connected directly to Wiesbaden via long-distance service of the Deutsche Bahn. More services to locations outside the immediate area connect through Mainz or Frankfurt Airport or Frankfurt Hauptbahnhof. Regional trains and bus services are coordinated by the Rhein-Main-Verkehrsverbund.

=== Public transport ===
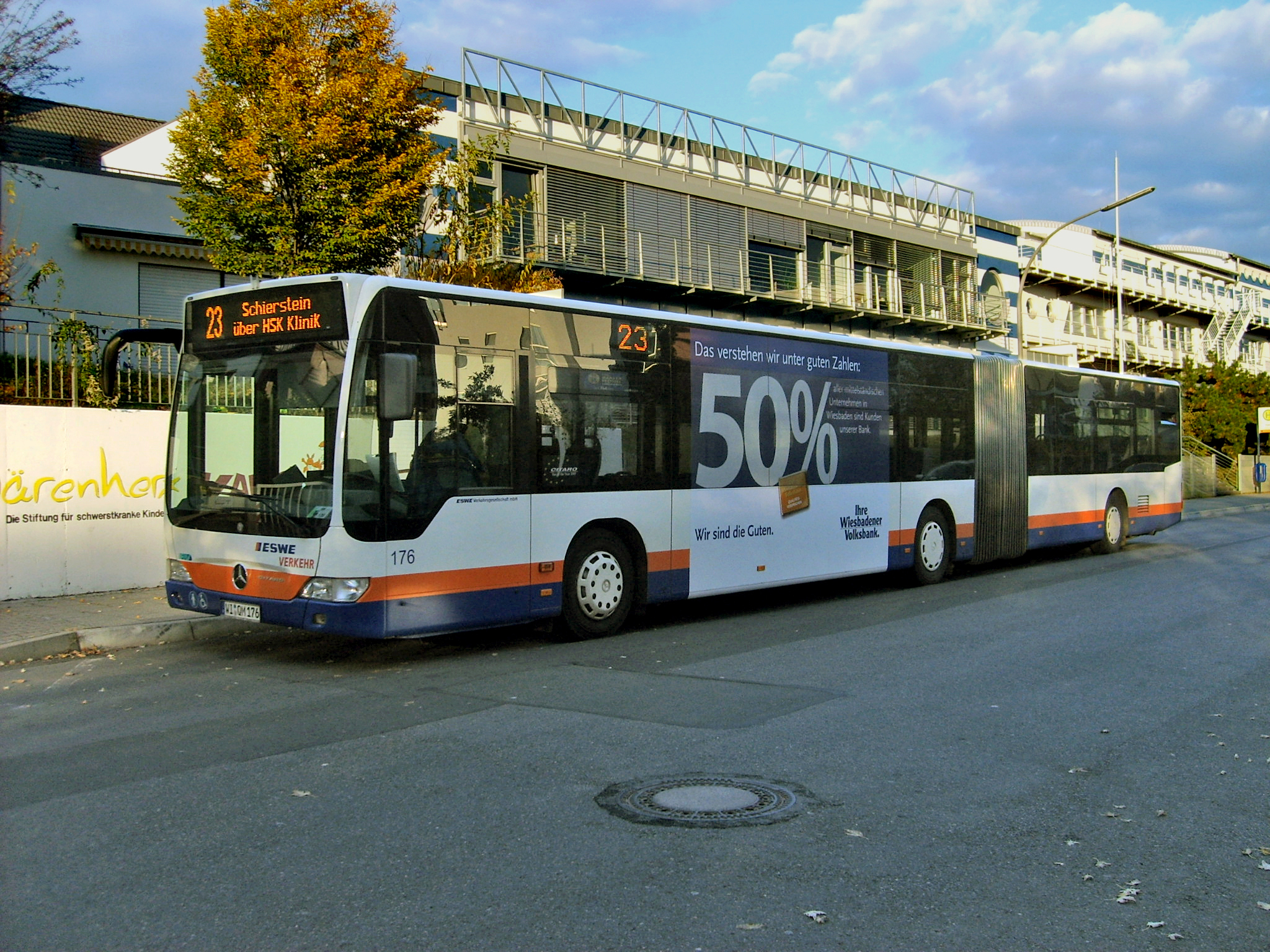
A bus at Schierstein harbor

Rhein-Main-Verkehrsverbund (RMV)

- S-Bahn

Wiesbaden is connected to the Frankfurt S-Bahn network and served by three lines which connect Wiesbaden with the densely populated Rhine Main Region. All routes have an at least 30 minute service during the day, in the rush hour partially every 15 minutes schedule. It provides access to nearby cities such as Mainz, Rüsselsheim, Frankfurt, Hanau, and Offenbach am Main, and smaller towns that are on the way.

- Bus

The city's public transportation service ESWE Verkehr connects all city districts to downtown by 45 bus lines in the daytime and 9 bus lines in the night. Five more bus lines, operated by the public transportation service of the city of Mainz, connects Wiesbaden's districts Kastel and Kostheim to Mainz downtown.

=== Airports ===
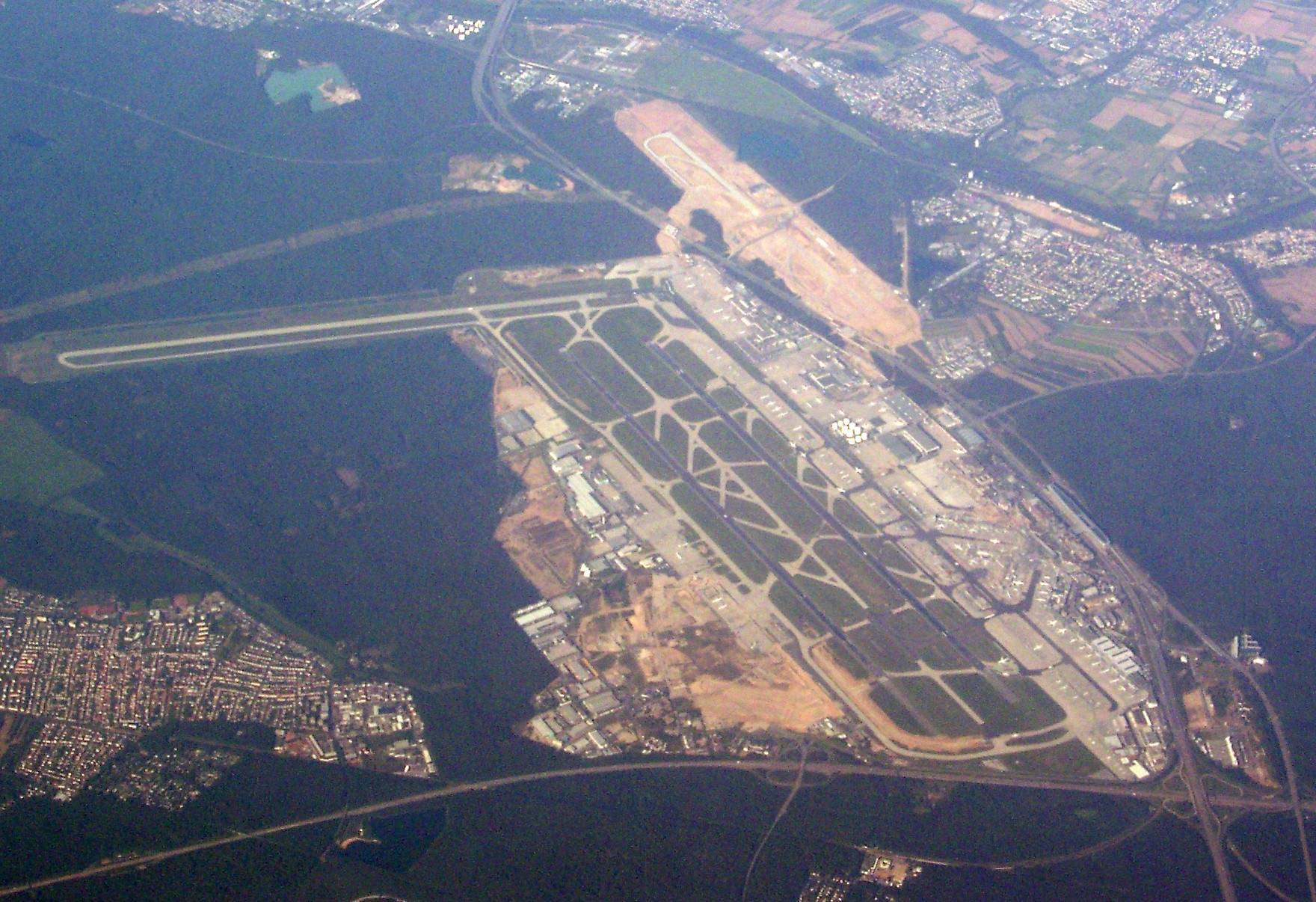
Aerial view of Frankfurt Airport

- Frankfurt Airport

The city can be accessed from around the world via Frankfurt Airport (Flughafen Frankfurt am Main) which is located 15 km (9.3 mi) east of Wiesbaden. The airport has four runways and serves 265 non-stop destinations. Run by transport company Fraport it ranks among the world's 10 busiest airports by passenger traffic and is the second busiest airport by cargo traffic in Europe. The airport also serves as a hub for Condor and as the main hub for German flag carrier Lufthansa. Depending on whether total passengers or flights are used, it ranks second or third busiest in Europe alongside London Heathrow Airport and Paris Charles de Gaulle Airport. Passenger traffic at Frankfurt Airport in 2011 was 56.5 million.

The airport can be reached by car or train and has two railway stations, one for regional and one for long-distance traffic. The S-Bahn lines S8 and S9 (direction Offenbach Ost or Hanau Hbf) departing at the regional train station take 30 minutes from the airport to Wiesbaden Central Station, the ICE trains departing at the long-distance railway station take also 30 minutes to the central station.

- Frankfurt Hahn Airport

Despite the name, Frankfurt Hahn Airport (Flughafen Frankfurt-Hahn) is not located anywhere near Frankfurt but is instead situated approximately 100 km (62 mi) from the city in Lautzenhausen (Rhineland-Palatinate). Hahn Airport was a major base for low-cost carrier Ryanair. This airport can be reached by car or bus. The nearest train station is in Traben-Trarbach, it is ca. 17 km (11 mi) from the airport, on foot. The roads are not lit.

=== Port ===
There are small container port operations nearby on the rivers Rhine and Main.

== Military ==
Lucius D. Clay Kaserne (formerly Wiesbaden Army Airfield or WAAF) is located adjacent to Wiesbaden-Erbenheim and is home to the US Army in Europe (USAREUR) headquarters, the 2nd Signal Brigade and the 66th Military Intelligence Brigade. The airfield was one of the points of origin for flights to Berlin in support of Operation Vittles (the Berlin airlift) during the Soviet blockade of Berlin. General Lucius D. Clay, the commander of the US occupation zone in Germany, was the architect of the airlift.

The United States Army runs a garrison in Wiesbaden. The facilities for US soldiers and families are spread across various locations including: Aukamn, Hainerberg, Mainz-Kastel and the Wiesbaden Army-Airfield, where the names of the streets are named after servicemen and women who sacrificed their lives during the Berlin Airlift.

== Economy ==
Wiesbaden hosts a number of international companies, which have their German or European headquarters there including Abbott Laboratories, DXC Technology, Ferrari, Federal-Mogul, Melbourne IT, Norwegian Cruise Line, and SCA. Several German companies also have their headquarters in Wiesbaden, including SGL Carbon, Dyckerhoff, KION Group, DBV-Winterthur, and R + V Versicherung. Wiesbaden is also home to the "Industriepark Kalle-Albert", an industrial park in the southern quarter of Biebrich. It is one of the largest in Germany with over 80 companies from the pharmaceutical and chemical industries, including Agfa-Gevaert, Clariant, Mitsubishi Chemical Corporation, and Shin-Etsu Chemical. The park was founded by chemical company Hoechst AG in 1997.

The Federal Criminal Police Office and the Federal Statistical Office of Germany are both based in Wiesbaden, along with many Hessian ministries such as the Hessian State Criminal Police Office.

At approximately €77,500, Wiesbaden has the second largest gross domestic product per inhabitant in Hesse, after Frankfurt, making it one of the richest cities in Germany. The purchasing power per inhabitant is €22,500.

== Culture ==
Wiesbaden's most important stage is the Hessisches Staatstheater Wiesbaden. Concert halls include the Friedrich-von-Thiersch-Saal of the Kurhaus. Wiesbaden has a State Library and a conservatory, where Max Reger studied and taught as a young man. Choirs such as the Wiesbadener Knabenchor, Schiersteiner Kantorei and Chor von St. Bonifatius are known in the region and even internationally.

=== International May Festival ===
The International May Festival is an annual arts festival presented by the Hessisches Staatstheater Wiesbaden every May. Established in 1896, it is one of the most distinguished international theatre and music festivals in the world. The festival features performances of plays, musicals, operas, and ballets. Concerts from a wide array of music are featured, as are artistic circus acts and modern dance presentations. Lectures, recitals, cabaret performances, and readings are also featured.

=== Rheingau Wine Festival ===
The wines and sparkling wines of the close Rheingau are presented annually at the ten-day festival in August, Rheingauer Weinwoche (Rheingau Wine Week) around the Wiesbaden City Hall, on the Schlossplatz (Palace Square), the square Dern'sches Gelände and in the pedestrian area. At 118 booths, Rheingau and Wiesbaden vintners offer their wine and sparkling wine and invite to discover , but also new vintages. Every year thousands of visitors taste the Rheingau Riesling wines. Regional specialities compatible with the wines are offered as well. A musical program entertains the wine festival guests. Initiated more than 30 years ago by the Rheingau vintners, this wine festival has a long tradition.

=== Shooting Star Market ===
Wiesbaden's Sternschnuppenmarkt is located at the central Schlossplatz and the neighbouring streets of the parliamentary building, old town hall, and market church. The Sternschnuppenmarkt takes place from the end of November until 23 December every year and is open from Monday until Thursday 10:30 – 9:00 pm, Friday and Saturday 10:30 – 9:30 pm, and Sunday 12:00 – 9:00 pm.

The market is related to the city arms of Wiesbaden: the colours blue and gold and the three lilies are characteristic. Four gates and an illuminated floral roof symbolizing Fleur-de-lis, consisting of twelve over ten metre high and twelve metre wide luminous lilies, emboss the Sternschnuppenmarkt.

Over 110 booths are decorated in oriental style, coloured blue and gold, offering Christmas style goods, arts and crafts as well as nostalgic carousels and a toy train. A Christmas tree more than 28 metres (92 feet) tall is decorated with 1000 blue and golden ties, 2500 electric bulbs and 30 flash bulbs. The nativity scene displays life-sized wooden figures.

=== Rheingau Musik Festival ===
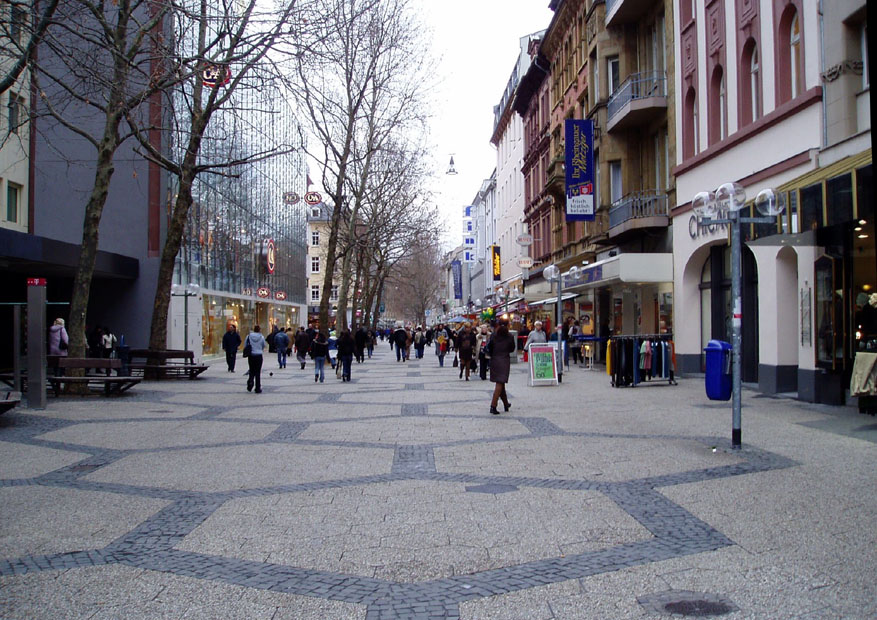
Wiesbaden pedestrian zone 2005

From the beginning in 1988 the Rheingau Musik Festival has staged summer concerts in the Marktkirche and in the concert hall of the Kurhaus now named Friedrich-von-Thiersch-Saal.

== Sport ==
Since 2007, Wiesbaden has been home to SV Wehen Wiesbaden, an association football team that plays in the 3. Liga. They play their home games at the Brita-Arena.

== Twin towns – sister cities ==
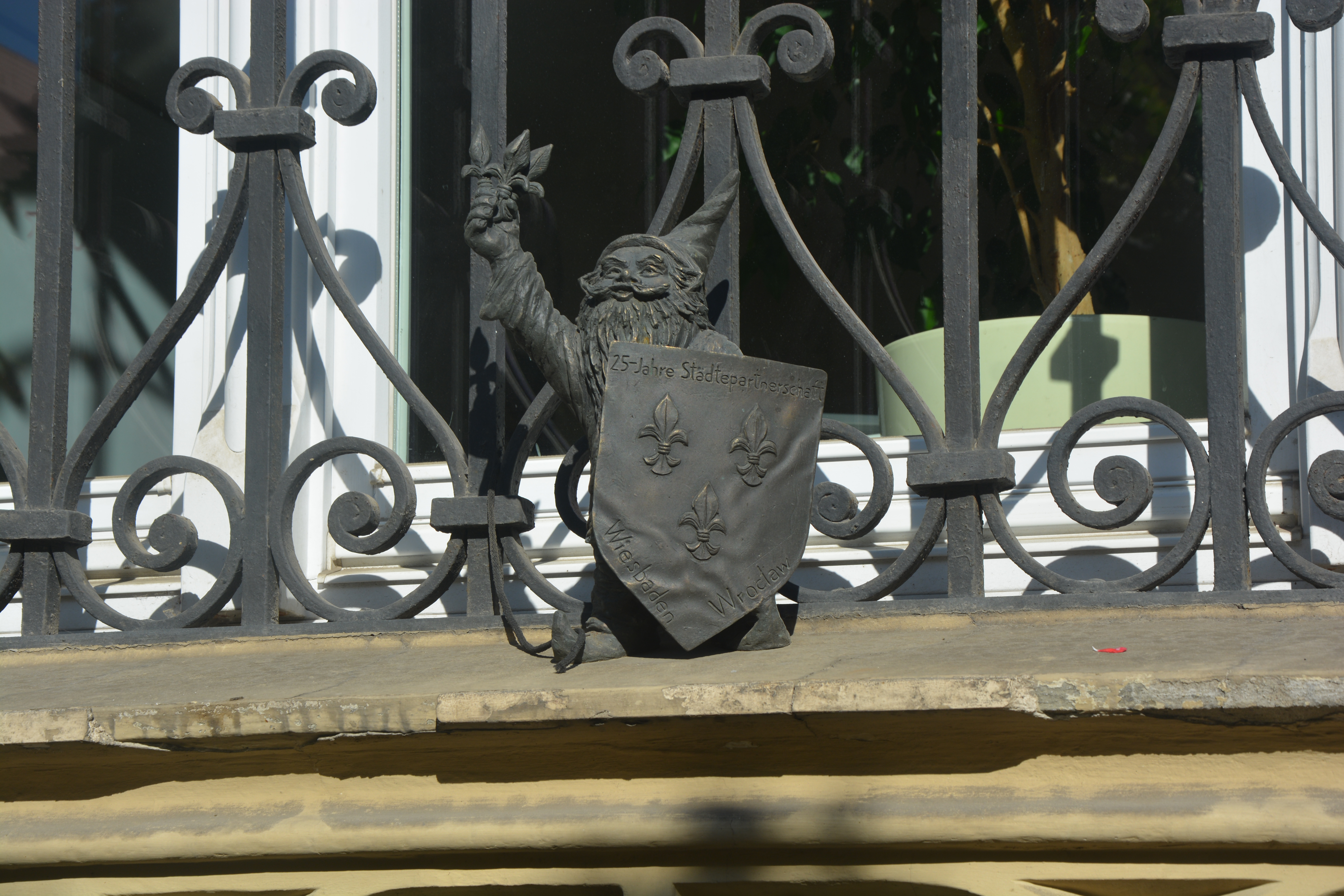
A Wrocław Dwarf celebrating the 25th anniversary of the partnership between Wiesbaden and Wrocław

Town twinning between Wiesbaden and other cities began with Klagenfurt in 1930, one of the first town-twinnings in Germany. Wiesbaden is twinned with:

- Klagenfurt, Austria (1930)
- Montreux, Switzerland (1953)
- Friedrichshain-Kreuzberg (Berlin), Germany (1964)
- Ghent, Belgium (1969)
- Fondettes, France (1975)
- Ljubljana, Slovenia (1977)
- Kfar Saba, Israel (1981)
- San Sebastián, Spain (1981)
- Wrocław, Poland (1987)
- Royal Tunbridge Wells, England, United Kingdom (1989)
- Görlitz, Germany (1990)
- Ocotal, Nicaragua (1990)
- Fatih, Turkey (2012)
- Kamianets-Podilskyi, Ukraine (2023)

== Coat of arms ==
Wiesbaden's coat of arms features three fleurs-de-lys, stylized representations of the city's heraldic symbol, the lily. The blazon is: "Azure, two and one fleurs-de-lys Or".

== Notable people ==
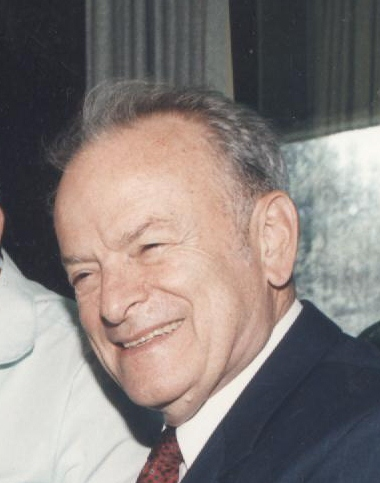
Shlomo Eckstein

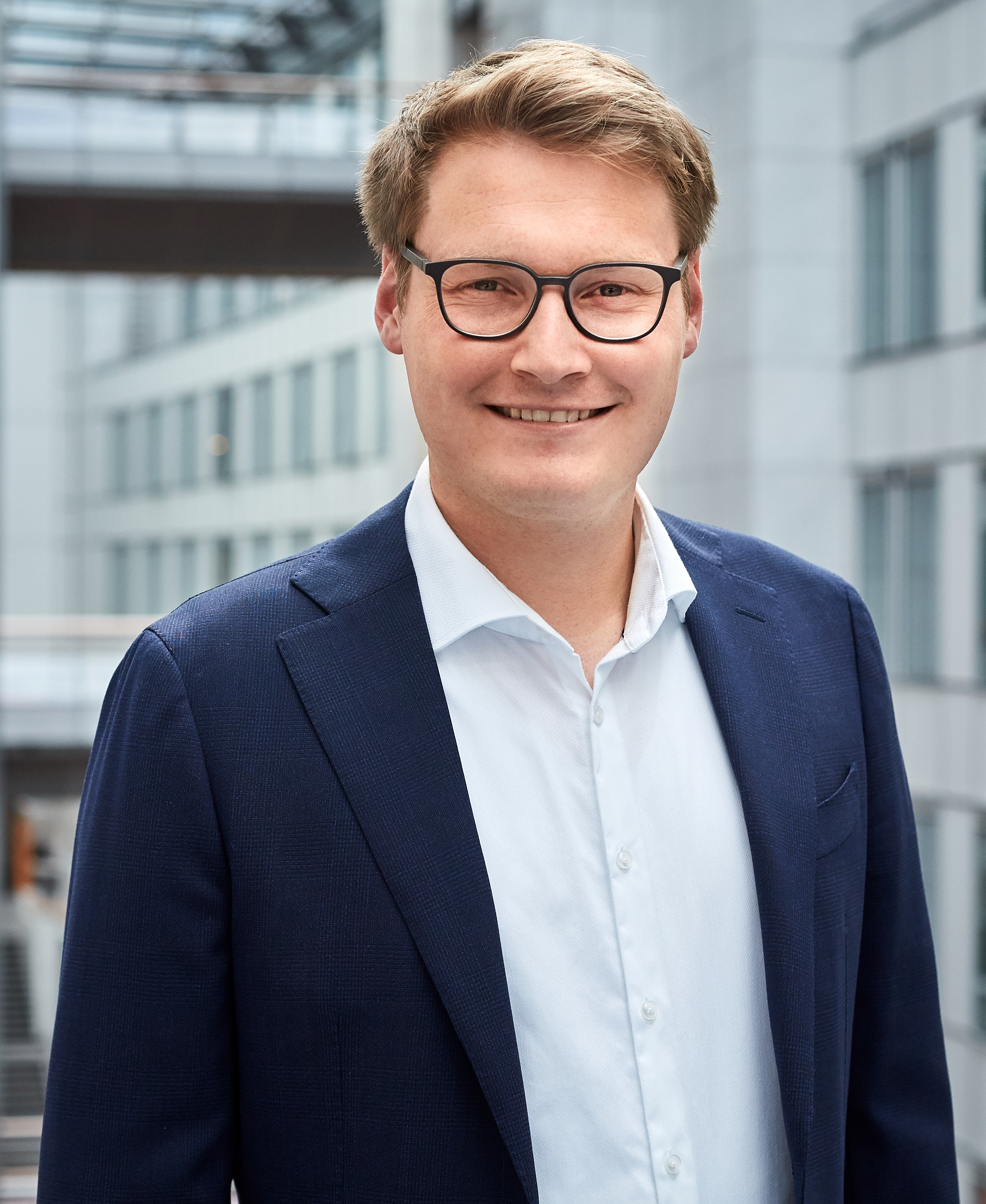
Moritz Körner

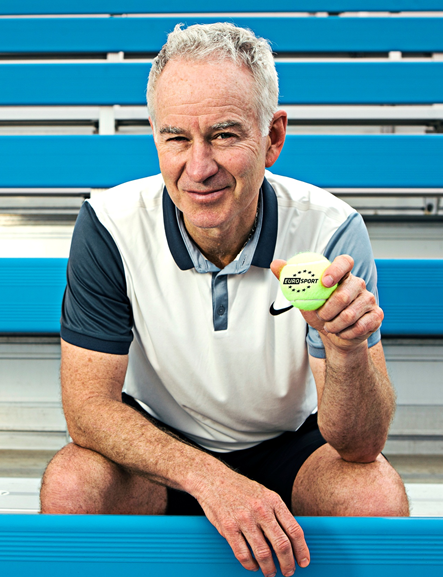
John McEnroe

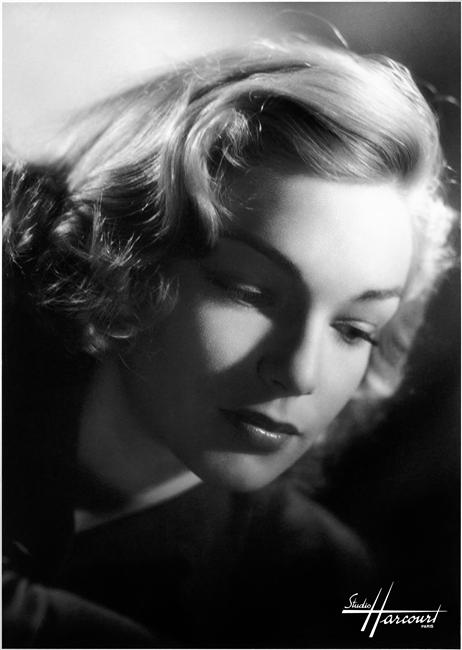
Simone Signoret

- Kathrin Ackermann (born 1938), actress
- Adolphe, Grand Duke of Luxembourg (1817–1905), Grand Duke of Luxembourg
- Norbert J. Becker (1937–2012), agricultural scientist and specialist in the area of vine breeding and viticulture
- Sven Becker (born 1968), German gynaecologist and university professor
- Adolphus Busch (1839–1913), founder of Anheuser-Busch
- Sarah Colonna (born 1974), American stand-up comedian
- Shlomo Eckstein (1929–2020), Israeli economist and President of Bar-Ilan University
- Gisela Ehrensperger (born 1943), Swiss operatic soprano
- Erwin Finlay-Freundlich (1885–1964), astronomer
- Petra Fuhrmann (1955–2019), member of the Hessian Landtag
- Biruté Galdikas (1946–2026), Lithuanian-Canadian primatologist
- Jürgen Grabowski (1944–2022), footballer
- Berthold Guthmann (1893–1944), lawyer and First World War veteran
- Peter Hanenberger (born 1942), automotive specialist for General Motors, previously chairman of Holden
- Frank-Christian Hansel (born 1964), politician
- Karl Herxheimer (1861–1942), dermatologist
- Renée Riese Hubert (1916–2005), German-born American writer and academic
- Christer Jöns (born 1987), racing driver
- Franz Kaiser (1891–1962), astronomer, discoverer of asteroid 717 Wisibada and asteroid 765 Mattiaca, both named in honour of the city of Wiesbaden
- Wilhelm Kempf (1906–1982), Catholic theologian, Bishop of Limburg 1949–1981
- Julia Kerr (1898–1965), composer and pianist
- Michael Kessler (born 1967), actor and comedian
- Alfred Koerppen (1926–2022), organist, music pedagogue, composer and academic teacher
- Moritz Körner (born 1990), German politician of the Free Democratic Party, Member of the European Parliament
- Otto Krebs (1873–1941), industrialist and art collector
- Günther Lütjens (1889–1941), admiral and commander of the World War II naval Operation Rheinübung, aboard the battleship Bismarck
- Bruce Maxwell (born 1990), American baseball player (born on a U.S. military base)
- John McEnroe (born 1959), American tennis player (born on a U.S. military base)
- August Momberger (1905–1969), racing driver and engineer
- Melody Perkins (born 1974), American actress
- Emil Pfeiffer (1846–1921), physician
- Bud Pierce (born 1956), American politician
- Dieter Rams (born 1932), industrial designer, former head of design for Braun
- Rudolf von Ribbentrop (1921–2019), captain in the Waffen-SS, recipient of the Knights Cross of the Iron Cross for bravery
- Leona Riemann (born 1952) German writer, author, and publisher
- Nico Rosberg (born 1985), Finnish-German racing driver, 2016 Formula One World Champion
- Heinrich Rubens (1865–1922), physicist
- Volker Schlöndorff (born 1939), film director
- Ernst Scholz (1874–1932), politician
- Kristina Schröder (born 1977), politician (CDU)
- Henry Schwarzschild (1925–1996), American activist for civil rights and human rights
- Simone Signoret (1921–1985), French actress
- Kiki VanDeWeghe (born 1958), American basketball player, coach and executive
- Valerie Weigmann (born 1989), Filipino-German actress, host and Miss World Philippines 2014 titleholder
- Silvia Weiss, soprano
- Susan Wild (born 1957), American lawyer and former member of the US House of Representatives (born on a U.S. military base)
- Arnold Walfisz (1892–1962), Polish mathematician
- William IV, Grand Duke of Luxembourg (born 1852, Biebrich Palace), reign 17 November 1905 – 25 February 1912
- Maria Yakunchikova (1870–1902), Russian painter and graphic artist
- Schoolboy Q (born 1986), American rapper (born on a U.S. military base)

=== Notable residents ===
- Eno, rapper, lives in Wiesbaden
- Peter Carl Fabergé, fled Russia to Germany, settled first in Bad Homburg and then in Wiesbaden
- Mayte Garcia, American belly dancer, actress, author, singer and choreographer, lived in Wiesbaden with her parents. It was here that she met her future husband, the singer Prince, backstage at one of his concert
- Alexej von Jawlensky, Russian Expressionist painter, lived there in 1922–1941 and died there
- Hava Lazarus-Yafeh (1930–1998), Orientalist, scholar, editor, and educator; born in Wiesbaden.
- Béla Kéler, Hungarian composer, he lived in Wiesbaden from 1863 until his death in 1882. He led the orchestra of the Second Regiment of the Duke of Nassau (1863–1866), and later also the spa orchestra (1870–1872).
- Vladimir Nabokov, Russian novelist, poet, translator and entomologist, writes in his autobiography about his memories of his childhood in Wiesbaden
- Priscilla Presley, lived in Wiesbaden with her parents. It was here that she met Elvis Presley.
- Max Reger, studied in Wiesbaden
- Mickey Rourke, resides in Wiesbaden at least part-time with his Russian-born girlfriend Anastassija Makarenko
- Debby Ryan, American actress, lived in Wiesbaden for three years
- Richard Wagner, settled in Biebrich (now part of Wiesbaden) in 1861, after the political ban against him in Germany was lifted. It was there that he began work on Die Meistersinger von Nürnberg.
- Reese Witherspoon, lived in Wiesbaden with her parents

=== Notable visitors ===
- In the 19th century, visitors to the Wiesbaden's famous hot springs included Johann Wolfgang von Goethe and Johannes Brahms. Brahms' Symphony No. 3 (Op. 90) was composed in Wiesbaden in the summer of 1883.
- Washington Roebling, chief engineer of the Brooklyn Bridge, came to Wiesbaden—along with his wife, Emily Warren Roebling—in 1873, hoping that the warm springs would ameliorate the effects of the decompression sickness he suffered as a result of working in caissons of the bridge.
- Russian author Fyodor Dostoevsky, who suffered from an acute gambling compulsion, allegedly lost his travelling money in Wiesbaden's Spielbank casino in 1865. The experience became the inspiration of his 1866 novel The Gambler (Russian Игрок), set in the fictitious place "Roulettenburg". Some historians have disputed this account, saying that Bad Homburg was the location for Dostoevsky's real-life misfortune.
- Wiesbaden's Bowling Green has been very popular in recent years since various open-air concerts have been held there by artists like Elton John (2009, 2011 & 2019), Rod Stewart (2009), Eric Clapton (2008), R.E.M. (2003), Sting (2001), Bryan Adams (2000), Simply Red (1999), José Carreras (1992), and Luciano Pavarotti (1993). Lionel Richie and Plácido Domingo (2nd time in Wiesbaden) have also performed there.

== Rivalry with Mainz ==
Mainz, on the opposite side of the Rhine, is Wiesbaden's archrival – the two cities are the capitals of their respective Bundesländer, and citizens of both cities jokingly refer to those on the other one as "living on the wrong side of the river".

== Fictional references ==
- In his short story "The Horror of the Heights" (1913), Sir Arthur Conan Doyle refers to an aerial region over Wiesbaden and Homburg in which aircraft mysteriously vanish.
- In the 1983 American television movie The Day After, Wiesbaden was the first city to be destroyed by a nuclear weapon during the escalating war between NATO and Warsaw Pact forces that eventually leads to a full-scale nuclear exchange between the United States and the Soviet Union.
- The historical novel series Romanike (2006–2014) by Codex Regius features Wiesbaden in the Roman age, or Aquae Mattiacorum, as one of its main locations.
