= Burg Frauenstein =

Burg Frauenstein may refer to:

- Castles in Germany:
  - Burg Frauenstein (Bad Lauterberg), Bad Lauterberg, Lower Saxony
  - Burgruine Frauenstein (Erzgebirge) in Frauenstein, Saxony
  - Burgstall Frauenstein Hohenschwangau in Bavaria
  - Burg Frauenstein (Pfalz), Ruppertsecken in Rhineland-Palatinate
  - Burg Frauenstein (Winklarn), Winklarn in Bavaria
  - Burg Frauenstein (Wiesbaden) in Wiesbaden-Frauenstein in Hesse
- Castle in Austria:
  - Burg Frauenstein (Mining) near Braunau am Inn
