= Schierstein =

- Borough of Wiesbaden
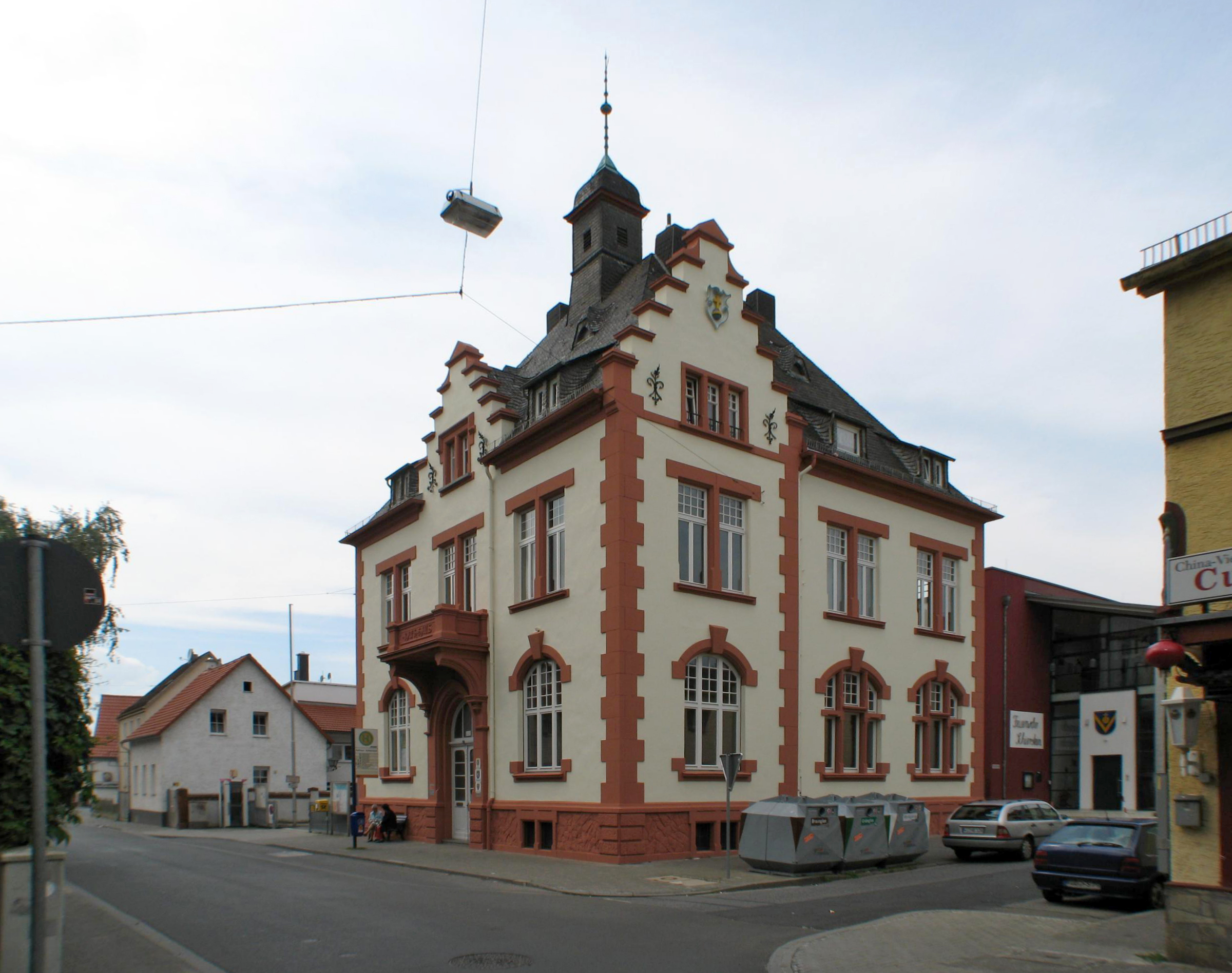
- Schierstein Rathaus

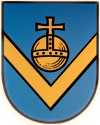
- Coat of arms

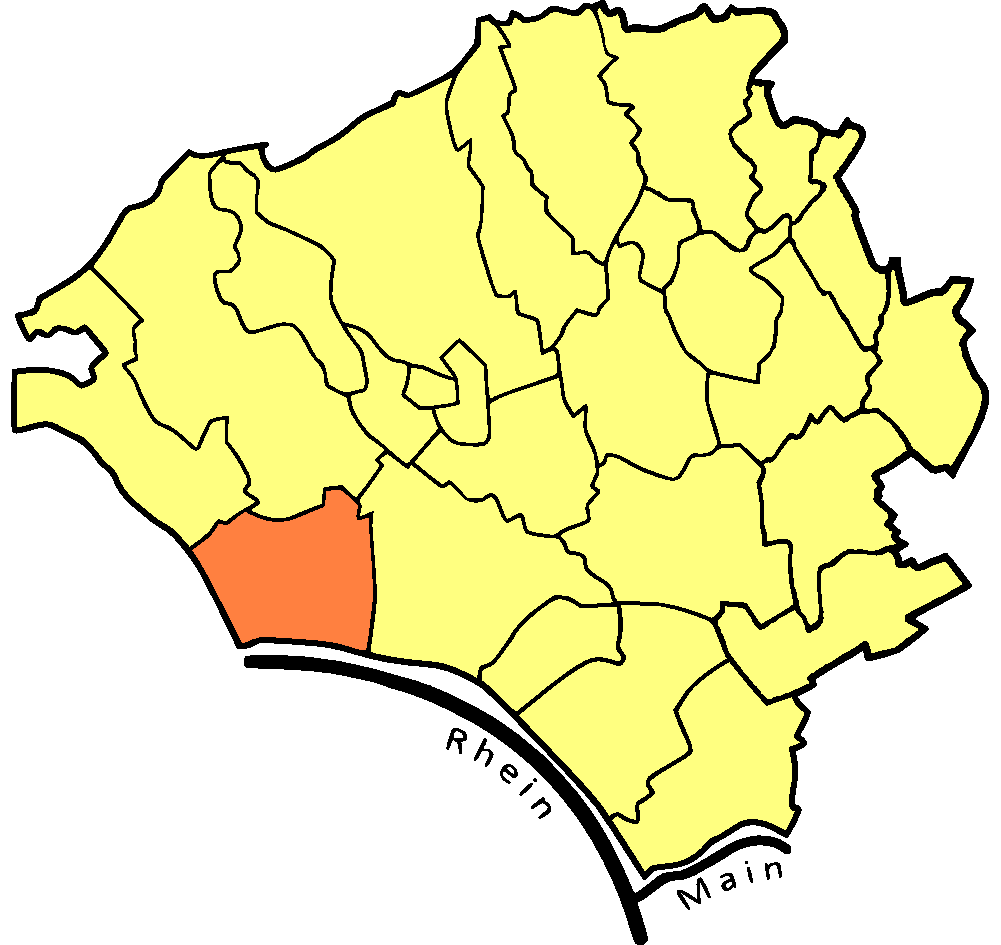
- Location of Schierstein in Wiesbaden
- Interactive map of Schierstein
- Location within Germany Location within Hesse
- Coordinates: 50°2′40″N 8°11′50″E
- Country: Germany
- State: Hesse
- District: Urban district
- City: Wiesbaden

Government
  - Mayor: Urban Egert (SPD)

Area
  - Total: 9.43 km^{2} (3.64 sq mi)

Population (2020-12-31)
  - Total: 10,642
  - Density: 1,130/km^{2} (2,920/sq mi)
- Time zone: UTC+01:00 (CET)
  - Summer (DST): UTC+02:00 (CEST)
- Postal codes: 65201
- Dialling codes: 0611
- Vehicle registration: WI

Schierstein (German pronunciation: [ˈʃiːɐ̯ʃtaɪn]) is a southwestern borough of Wiesbaden, capital of state of Hesse, Germany. First mentioned in historical records in 860, Schierstein was incorporated into Wiesbaden in 1926. Today the borough has about 10,000 residents. Situated on the Rhine River, Schierstein is known as the "Gateway to the Rheingau."

== History ==
Before about 2000 years ago, a small Germanic settlement was located north of present-day Schierstein. The inhabitants lived on fishing and hunting. The course of the Rhine at this time extended to the edge of the forest. Here there was a large lake, which extended as far west as the Binger Loch (near Bingen am Rhein). Sand deposits and other evidence indicates that this lake extended as far north as Blierweg (near Autobahn A-66), Nußberg, and Freudenberg. Over the centuries, the channel at Binger Loch grew deeper and consequently the water level and area of the lake decreased. The dry land soon attracted the first settlers to present-day Schierstein.

By that time, the Roman Empire was expanding north, building fortresses beyond the Rhine. A colony of soldiers was established in Schierstein which served as an advanced guard. The colony was established north of the present Schierstein railway station, as shown by archeological finds of bronze, stone, horn and clay discovered there. Also found from this period was a giant Jovian pillar. Such columns were often erected by Roman landowners to show that their property stood under the protection of the deity. The Schiersteiner pillar is completely preserved. It clearly depicts a Germanic view of Jupiter, as a flying rider modelled after the Germanic god Wotan.

Roman rule in Schierstein lasted for almost three and a half centuries. Then the Franks settled in the Rhine Valley. To better manage the Frankish Empire, Charlemagne divided his kingdom into individual "Gaue". Schierstein belonged to Königssondergau, which stretched from Walluf to Kriftel. The region west of Schierstein received its current name of "Rheingau".

The name of Schierstein changed often over time: it was Skerdesstein in 943, Skerdisstein by 1000, and Scerstein in 1015. This last name is similar present-day vernacular pronunciation "Scherstaa". Schierstein means "Fortress of Sherto", suggesting that there was probably a castle here. This assumption is confirmed by Roman bricks found on the grounds of the Söhnlein plant. Documents dating to 1275 show that a court (German Centgericht) functioned here made up of the mayor and seven jury members.

In the following centuries, the small community suffered many armed conflicts, being spared from none of the wars that raged across the Rhineland. The population especially suffered during the Thirty Years War (1618–1648). Up to that time, the farmers had achieved a certain prosperity, but, according to a chronicle of several large estates, almost all were terribly devastated and vineyards left to grow wild. The plague decimated the population and Schierstein fell into large debt. Therefore, the community requested the Count of Nassau Georg August Samuel to allow the town free movement of goods without tax (which he did). Only in 1720 was the community able to cover part of its debts.

From 1745 to 1763, Schierstein was alternately occupied by French and imperial troops and the citizens forced to give them quarter. However, the Protestant Church was constructed at this time.

In the middle of the 19th century, Schierstein began to grow strongly due to the construction of the port. At the beginning of the 20th century, it was connected with Wiesbaden by a tram, via Biebrich. In 1926, Schierstein was incorporated into the city of Wiesbaden.

In 1923, the Schierstein Kaserne was built east of the town center to house occupation troops of the French Army (the 133rd and 243rd Field Artillery Regiments) following World War I. In January 1926, the French troops were replaced in Schierstein by two English infantry companies of the 2nd Battalion, who remained until 1930. In 1938, the Kaserne officially became a German military installation, housing the 12th German Medical Supply Depot. The depot remained at Schierstein until late 1945, when the United States Army forces occupied Wiesbaden. The Schierstein Kaserne eventually became the headquarters of the U.S. Air Force 497th Reconnaissance Technical Group in early 1952, who remained until the site was deactivated on 1 July 1992. The site of the former Kaserne has since been redeveloped as residential housing.

== General description ==
The old town center with its narrow alleys is situated upstream of the Schiersteiner Port. The Rococo Christophoruskirche is located in the center of the old town. Directly next door is the entrance to the Heritage Museum. On Bernhard-Schwarz-Straße, a green space marks the location of the destroyed synagogue.

On Küferstraße, a well-known pair of white storks nests on an abandoned chimney. About 50 stork pairs breed in a nature conservation area on the grounds of the Rhine water treatment plant on the west side of Schierstein, between the borough and Walluf. The storks have been reintroduced by the Schiersteiner Storchengemeinschaft (“Schierstein Stork Association”) beginning in 1972. Since the reintroduction of the white stork in Schierstein, over 600 young storks have been born in Schierstein. Many of them now breed in other places in Germany and abroad.

Also west of the town center stands the Rheingau Palace, the former head of Sektkellerei Söhnlein. Following the acquisition of Söhnlein also by its Wiesbaden-based competitor Henkell's, the headquarters was abandoned. Today, the buildings are used for offices. Among other things, a branch of the European Business School of Oestrich-Winkel is located here.

To the east of the old town Schierstein borders the great industrial Äppelallee of the neighboring borough of Biebrich. North is the Siedlung Freudenberg neighborhood, part of the borough of Wiesbaden-Dotzheim. In the south across the Rhine the borough of Mombach, northwest of Schierstein is the borough of Frauenstein and west is the wine center of Walluf.

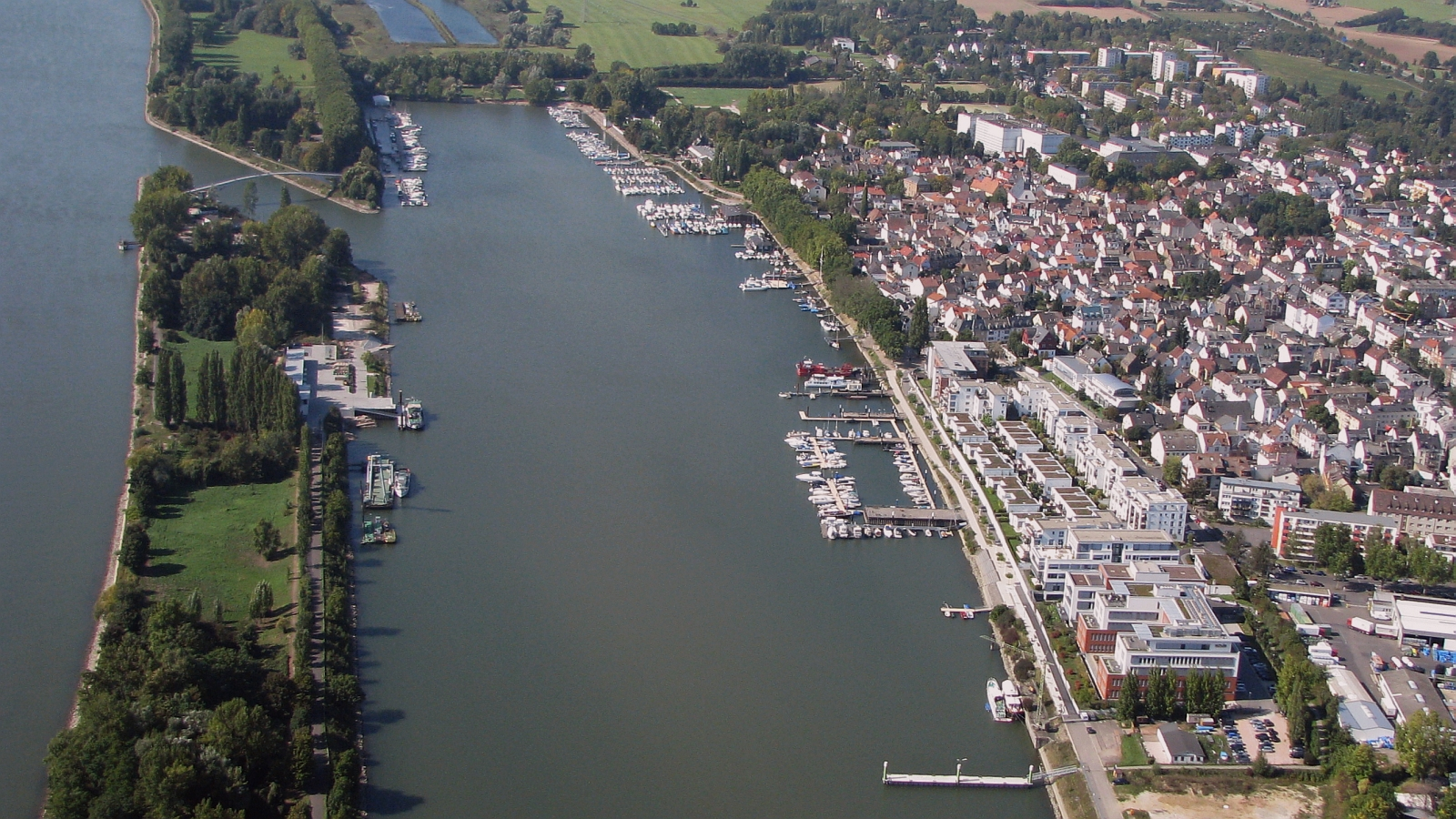
Aerial photograph of Wiesbaden-Schierstein with Schierstein Port

== Schiersteiner Port ==
The Schiersteiner Port is situated along the Rhine (km 506.0) in Schierstein. The Port is largely used as a marina today. Constructed in 1858, the port has a length of 1250 meters and has become a water sports center with a 1250-meter-long regatta course. On its northern shore is the port promenade, which because of its Mediterranean flair, has become known as the "Schiersteiner Riviera".

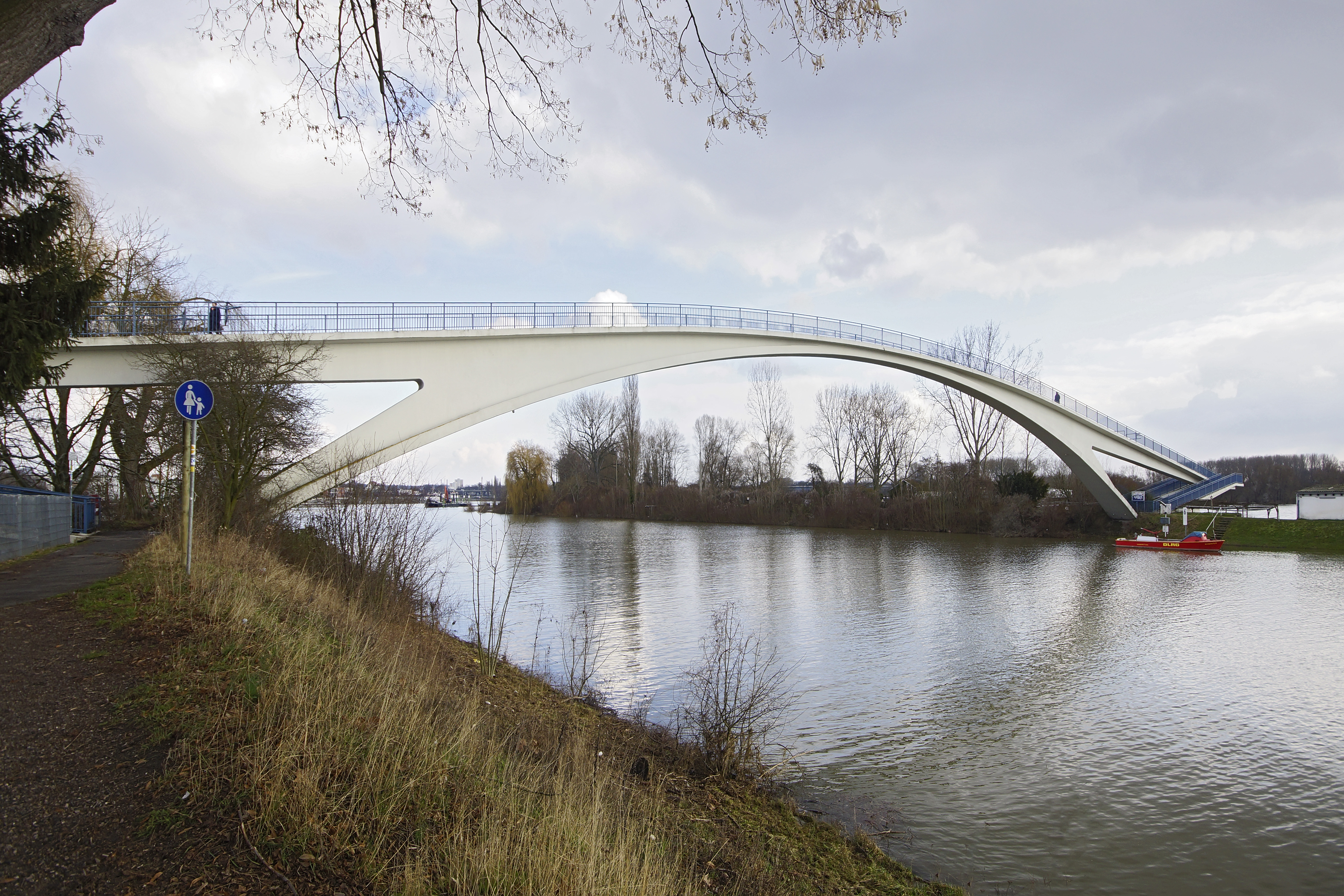
Dyckerhoff Bridge

Spanning the small exit from the harbor to the Rhein is the Dyckerhoff Bridge. The pedestrian bridge was donated in 1967 by the Wiesbaden cement manufacturer of that name. The bridge, with its elegant arc, was one of the first prestressed concrete bridges in Germany.

Several yacht clubs and water-sports clubs are based at the Schiersteiner Port, including the Middle Rhine Motorboat Club and the water-sports club Wassersportverein Schierstein. The port also has a boathouse for the Wiesbaden schools and the Wiesbaden-Biebrich rowing society, which offers rowing as a hobby and a competitive sport for youth and adults.

For more than 15 years, the Volkshochschule Wiesbaden has offered training for water sports at the Schiersteiner Port, including customer seminars, boat driver's licenses for sailing and motor boats, and navigation.

The "Schiersteiner Harbor Festival" is held at the Port every year in mid-July. It includes dragon boat races and a fireworks display. In addition, the Wiesbaden-Biebrich Rowing Society holds the Ruder ("Helm") Regatta at the Schiersteiner Port each year. Since August 2007, the 1.9 km swimming distance of the "Ironman 70.3 Germany Wiesbaden" Triathlon has gone through the Schiersteiner Harbor docks, at the western end of which is the first transition area for cycling.

For several years, the Schiersteiner Port regularly hosts the Wiesbaden city championship in Formula Future motorboat racing. In this discipline, Wiesbaden has provided, since the year 2000, one European champion, two German champions, three German runners-up, four Hessen champions, and a 5th Place in the world championships. Leaders in placement and youth training is the Wiesbaden Yacht Club. For the city championship and the necessary training, a course is laid out with buoys in the eastern Harbor.

== Christophoruskirche ==
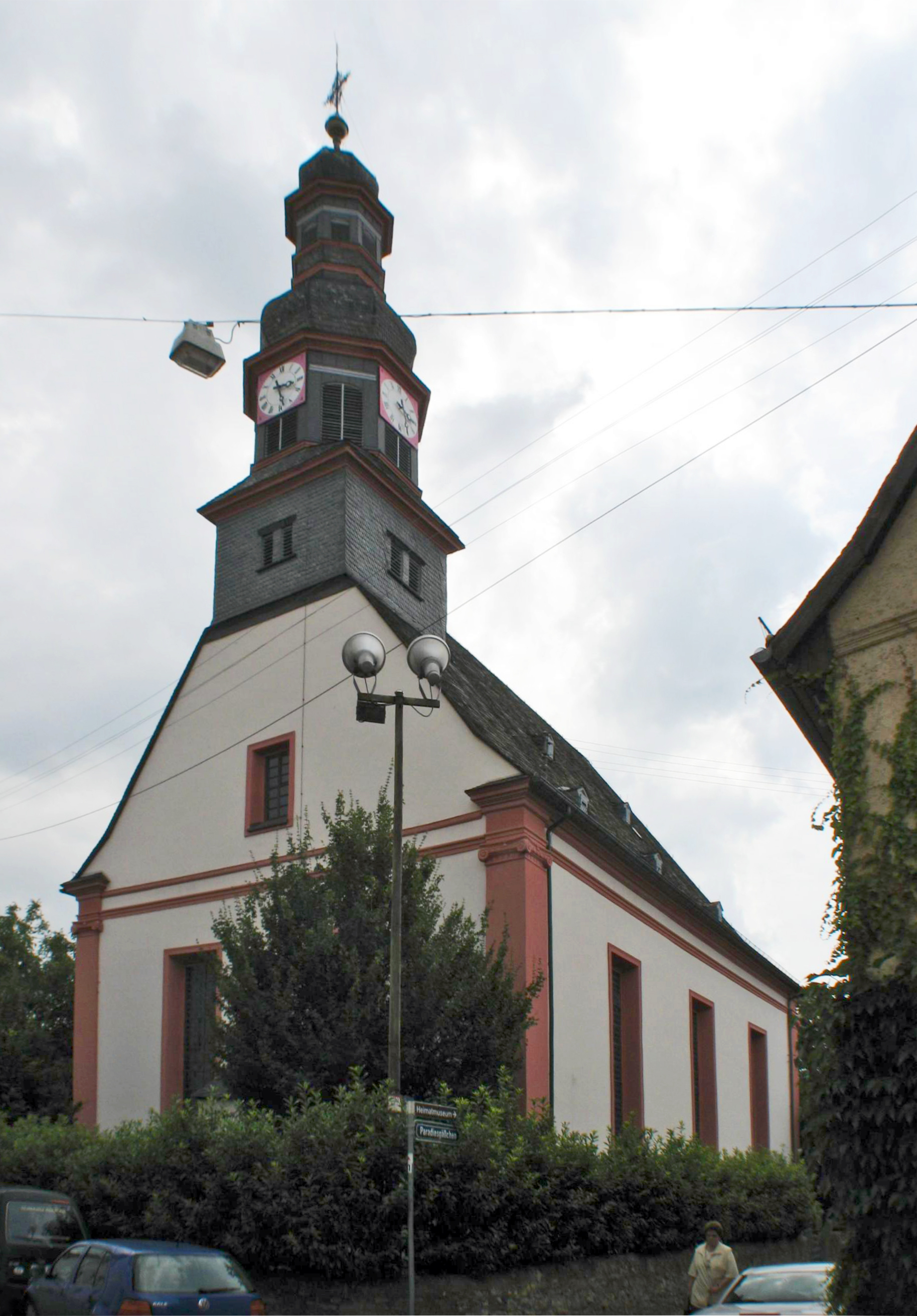
Christophoruskirche

The Protestant Christophoruskirche, dedicated to St. Christopher, was built in 1752. It replaced an older church from the 9th century, which had become so dilapidated that in January 1752 parts of the church tower collapsed. The congregation had already contemplated for several years to build a new church, since the old building had become too small. The Baroque architect Anselm Franz von Ritter zu Groenesteyn, who owned property in Schierstein, had donated a site to the church in 1750. In 1748, the Mayor of Frankfurt, merchant and banker Johann Georg von Schweitzer (a member of the Frauenstein Gesellschaft), had allowed the Schierstein curate a collection of 604 guilders in the Free Imperial City, which provided the basis for the construction of the church.

After the blueprints of Johann Georg Bager were rejected by Prince Charles of Nassau-Usingen as too big and too expensive, a cheaper plan was designed by Johann Scheffer, which the prince approved. Von Ritter contributed suggestions, especially for the interior decoration.

Von Schweitzer commissioned Frankfurt sculptor Johann Daniel Schnorr to build pulpit and altar. On the pulpit, Schnorr carved three coats of arms: in the middle was the emblem of Nassau-Usingen, on the right was the Schierstein orb with a cross, and on the left was the crest of von Schweitzer, the Frankfurt benefactor. Above the pulpit are three cherubs: one holding a chalice (representing faith), another holding an anchor (representing hope), and the third - placed higher than faith and hope - holding the Commandments (representing Love). (This is a representation of St. Paul's quotation in 1 Corinthians 13:13 - "But now remain faith, hope, love, these three, but the greatest of these is love".) The four Corinthian columns of the altar area symbolize the four Evangelists. The twelve Doric columns bearing the galleries represent the twelve apostles.

Scheffer, for reasons of cost, planned a small wooden bell tower instead of a stone tower. The tower was built on the eastern end of the roof, positioned directly behind the pulpit from where the bells could be rung.

The foundation stone was laid on 3 May 1752 and the topping-out ceremony on 9 November 1752. The costs of building of 9006 guilders was nearly double the original estimate, but it was offset by revenue of 9262 guilders obtained from loans, collections (especially from the Frankfurt collection), donations and grants, together with the proceeds from the sale of recyclable materials salvaged from the old church.

The church is used for concerts of the Schiersteiner Kantorei, and is a venue of the Rheingau Musik Festival.

== Religious life ==
Besides the church, the Protestant community of Schierstein also includes the over forty-year-old Church of the Resurrection in North Schierstein (the part of the borough north of the railway line). Schierstein is also home to the Roman Catholic Church of St. Peter und Paul, consecrated in 1968. The portal displays hammered-copper symbols of the primary occupations of the residents of Schierstein (fishing, agriculture, viticulture, industry), as well as the historical symbol of Schierstein (the royal orb) and the symbols for the two patron saints (a key and sword, respectively).

== Demographics ==
As of 30 November 2008, Schierstein has 10,106 inhabitants, of whom 5,228 (51.7%) are women and 4,878 (48.3%) are men. The percentage of foreigners is 13.7% (1,384). As of 1 January 2008, the primary countries of origin of the foreign citizens were Turkey (23.6%), Greece (22.7%), Italy (8.1%), Poland (6.1%), and Serbia (5.5%).

Also as of 1 January 2008, the age structure of the population was as follows:

Age (years)	Percentage of Population
Younger than 6	5.1
6 to 17	10.4
18 to 49	41.4
50 to 64	19.3
65 to 74	14.2
75 and older	9.7

== Transportation ==
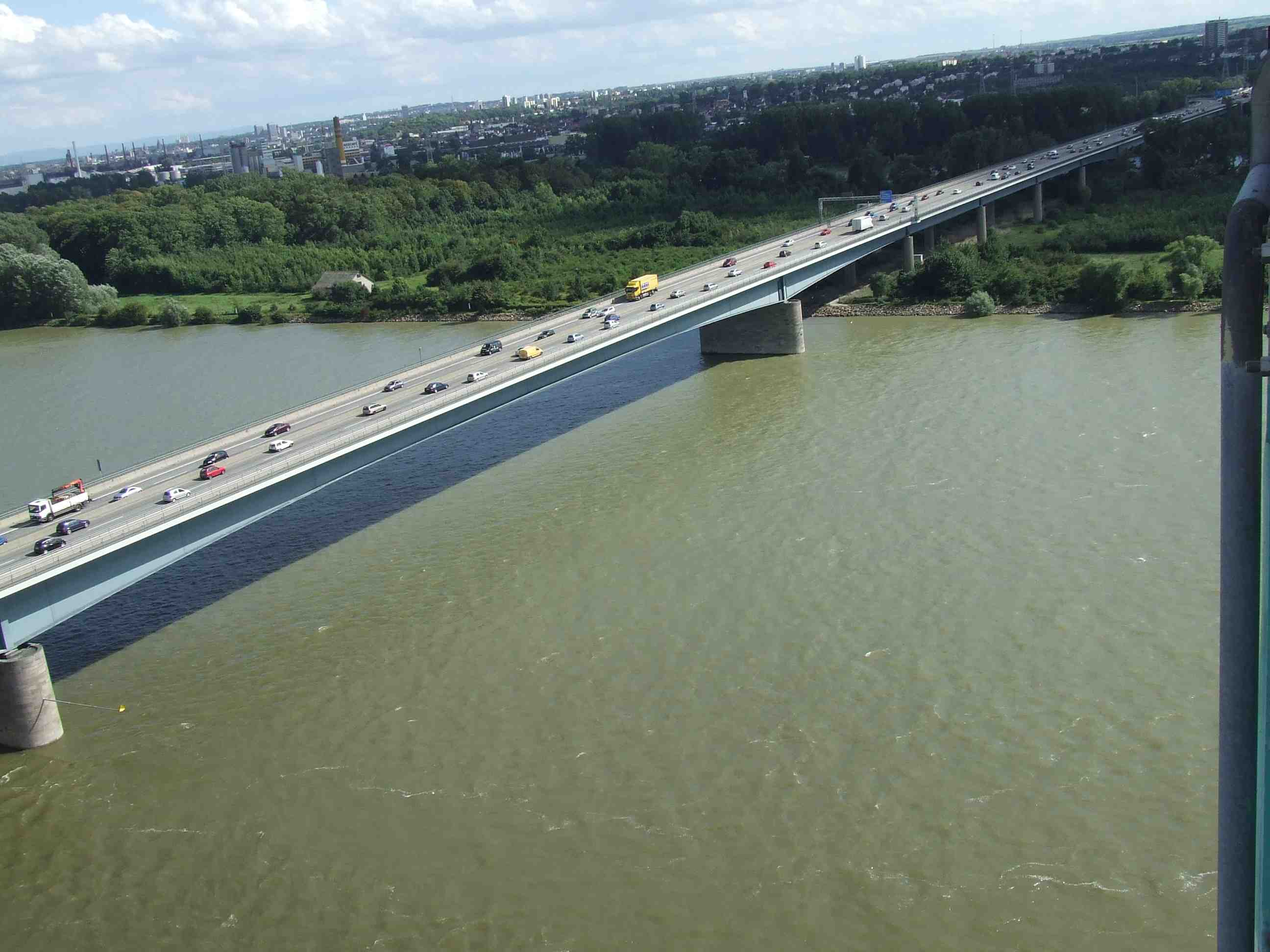
Schierstein Bridge (A 643) over the Rhine

North of the Schierstein town center, running parallel to the Rhine, is Autobahn 66. West of Schierstein it becomes Federal Route 42, leading into the Rheingau to Rüdesheim. Northeast of Schierstein is the Schiersteiner Kreuz interchange, where Autobahn 643 intersects the A 66. The A 643 leads south to Mainz, crossing the Rhine via the Schierstein Bridge.

Schierstein's railway station is situated on the East Rhine railway, which connects Wiesbaden's Hauptbahnhof (main train station) with Niederlahnstein. The station is served by regional trains to Koblenz and Frankfurt am Main via the Wiesbaden Hauptbahnhof.

Schierstein is served by several bus routes of Stadtwerke Wiesbaden (ESWE) and the Omnibusverkehr Rhein-Nahe GmbH (ORN), which connect it with the Wiesbaden city center. In the opposite direction, ORN buses lead to the Rheingau and Taunus. MVG Mainz and ESWE operate Community Route 47 to Gonsenheim and route 45 to the Mainz Hauptbahnhof via Mainz-Mombach.

== Industry ==
Schierstein has two industrial areas - on the east side of the borough along the A-643 and a smaller area north of the railroad line. Major companies include Dow Corning, bearing-manufacturer Federal Mogul(formerly Glyco Metall), and chemical distributor A. + E. Fischer-Chemie.

== Politics ==
Election results for representatives to the borough assembly (Ortsbeirat) of Schierstein are given in the following table (expressed in percent):

	Christian Democratic Union	Social Democratic Party	Alliance '90/The Greens	Free Democratic Party	Free Voters	Other	Voter turnout
2016	32.3	39.7	17.7	10.2	---	---	44.2
2011	35.7	39.7	15.9	1.6	3.5	3.6	43.0
2006	39.5	47.3	9.5	2.7	---	1.0	41.9
2001	36.4	49.6	8.0	6.0	---	---	50.4
1997	35.0	50.8	10.5	3.6	---	---	65.2
1993	32.5	42.3	10.0	5.5	9.6	---	68.6
1989	32.6	55.4	7.1	5.0	---	---	74.3
1985	42.0	48.6	5.0	3.7	---	0.6	70.9
1981	45.9	46.0	---	7.3	---	0.8	69.1
1977	46.8	47.6	---	5.6	---	---	73.4
1972	34.3	59.2	---	6.5	---	---	77.9

The distribution of seats in the Ortsbeirat of Schierstein is as follows:

	CDU	SPD	The Greens	FDP	Free Voters	Total
2016	5	6	3	1	-	15
2011	5	6	3	-	1	15
2006	5	5	1	-	-	11
2001	4	5	1	1	-	11
1997	4	6	1	-	-	11
1993	3	5	1	1	1	11
1989	4	6	1	-	-	11
1985	6	8	1	-	-	15
1981	7	7	-	1	-	15
1977	7	8	-	-	-	15
1972	5	9	-	1	-	15

=== Borough Directors of Wiesbaden-Schierstein ===
- 1946-1948 Jakob Oho (SPD)
- 1948-1949 Otto Bergs (SPD)
- 1949-1960 Alfred Schumann (SPD)
- 1960-1970 Karl Pracht (SPD)
- 1971-1972 Hans Römer (SPD)
- 1972-1974 Lothar Körner (SPD)
- 1975-1981 Norbert Wiese (SPD)
- 1981-1985 Karl-Heinz Seibert (CDU)
- 1985-2010 Dieter Horschler (SPD)
- since 2010 Urban Egert (SPD)

== Sports ==
In Schierstein there is a community sports club, Turngemeinde Schierstein 1848, with offerings in handball, track and field, tennis, and gymnastics. Schierstein is also home to several football clubs - FSV Schierstein 08 eV, SV Schierstein 1913 eV, SG Schierstein 1979 and Hellas Schierstein; Freie Turnerschaft Schierstein 1913 eV, and the water-sports club Wassersportverein Schierstein. In addition, in recent years, the Schierstein Port has become one of the German centers of dragon boat racing.
