= St. Peter und Paul, Schierstein =

St. Peter und Paul
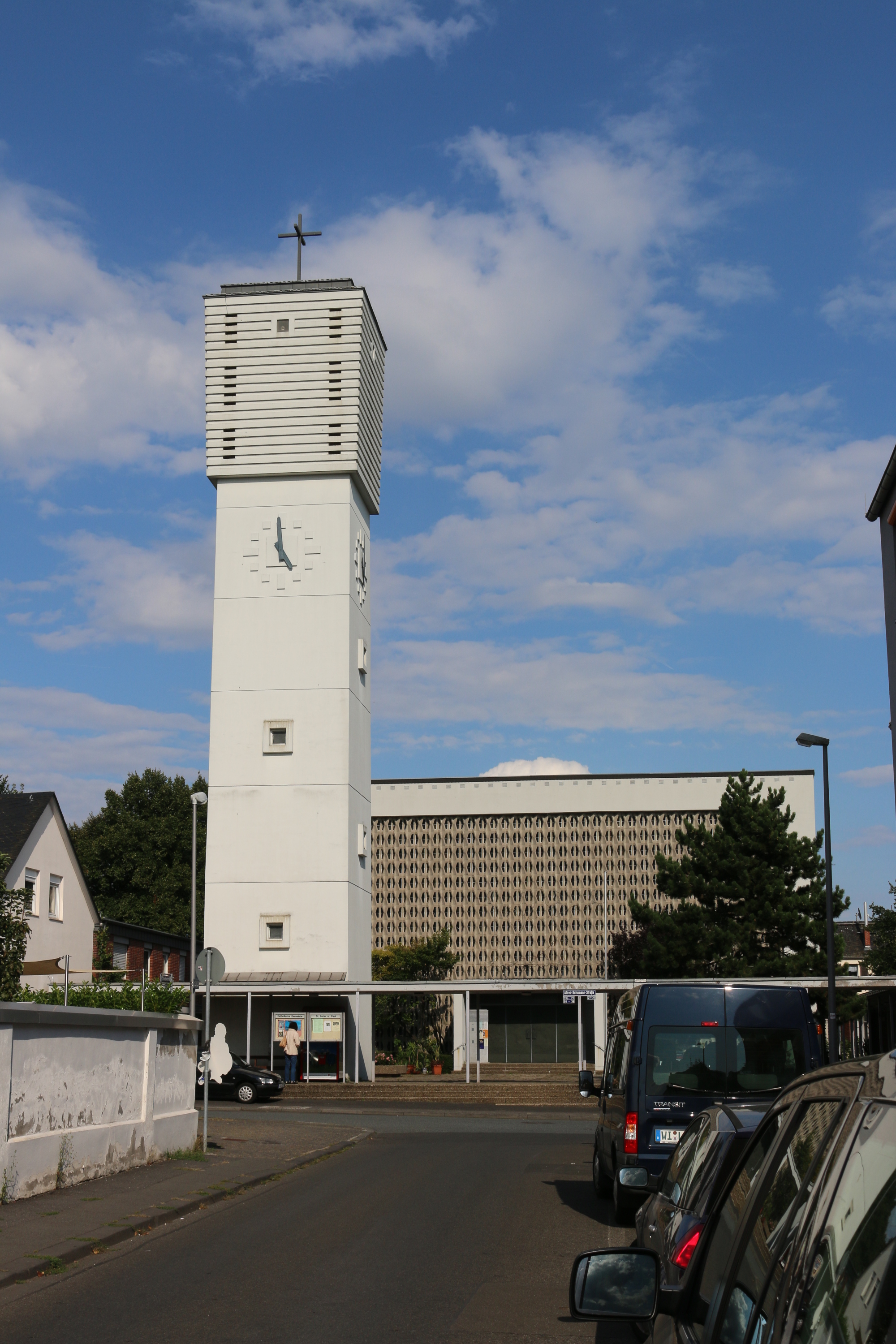
- St. Peter und Paul
- 50°02′49″N 8°11′53″E
- Location: Schierstein, Wiesbaden
- Country: Germany
- Denomination: Catholic

History
- Status: Parish church
- Dedication: Saint Peter, Saint Paul

Architecture
- Functional status: Active
- Completed: 1968

St. Peter und Paul is a Catholic church and parish in the borough of Schierstein, Wiesbaden, Hesse, Germany.

== History ==
The Catholic church in Schierstein, part of Wiesbaden, was designed by Johannes Traut, completed in 1967 and consecrated in 1968, dedicated to the apostles Peter and Paul. The parish is part of the Diocese of Limburg.

== Building ==
The church is built on a parabolic floorplan, with a separate bell tower. It features a pentaptychon by Helga Hein-Guardian, and a pipe organ built by Klais in 1970, with 27 stops on two manuals and pedal.

A garden behind the church, Bibelgarten, features plants mentioned in the Bible, with explanations.

== Parish ==
As of 1 January 2013, St. Peter und Paul became a merged parish with eight former parishes, also including St. Klara in Klarenthal, St. Josef and Mariä Heimsuchung in Dotzheim, St. Georg und Katharina in Frauenstein, and four parishes in Biebrich: St. Hedwig, St. Kilian, Herz Jesu and St. Marien.
