= Walluf =

- Municipality
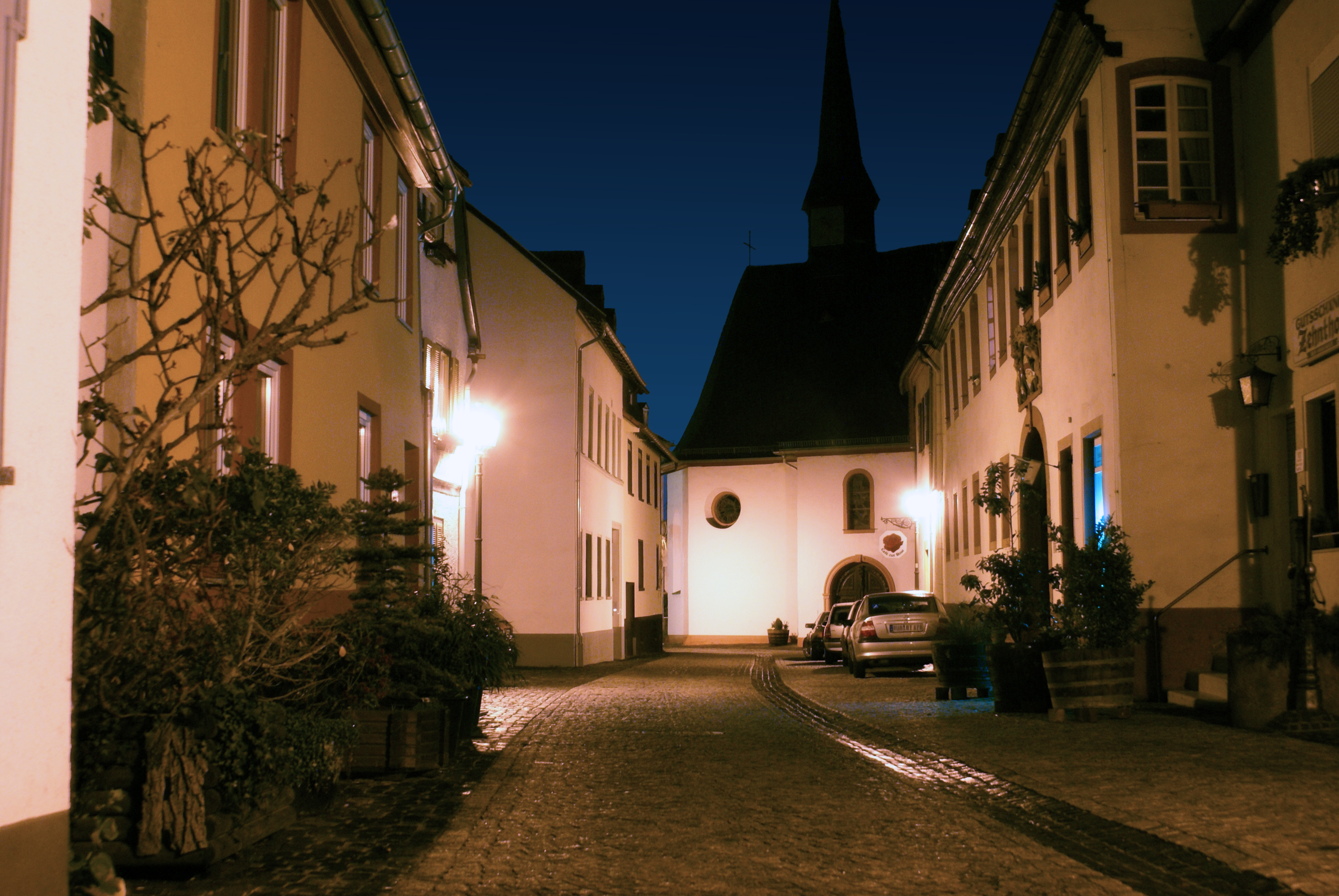
- Niederwalluf's center

- Coat of arms

- Location of Walluf within Rheingau-Taunus-Kreis district
- Interactive map of Walluf
- Location within Germany Location within Hesse
- Coordinates: 50°03′N 08°09′E
- Country: Germany
- State: Hesse
- Admin. region: Darmstadt
- District: Rheingau-Taunus-Kreis

Government
  - Mayor (2020–26): Nikolaos Stavridis (Non-partisan)

Area
  - Total: 6.74 km^{2} (2.60 sq mi)
- Elevation: 90 m (300 ft)

Population (2025-12-31)
  - Total: 5,494
  - Density: 815/km^{2} (2,110/sq mi)
- Time zone: UTC+01:00 (CET)
  - Summer (DST): UTC+02:00 (CEST)
- Postal codes: 65396
- Dialling codes: 06123
- Vehicle registration: RÜD
- Website: www.walluf.de

Walluf is a municipality in the Rheingau-Taunus-Kreis in the Regierungsbezirk of Darmstadt in Hesse, Germany. With 5,581 residents in its 6.74 square kilometer area, it is the most densely populated community in the Rheingau-Taunus-Kreis.

== Geography ==
=== Location ===
Walluf, also known as Pforte des Rheingaus ("Gateway to the Rheingau"), lies on the southern slope of the Taunus Mountains and on the north bank of the Rhine River. Walluf is the Rheingau's easternmost community. It is made up of the two formerly independent communities of Niederwalluf and Oberwalluf.

Walluf lies in the valley of a creek also named the Walluf (German Wallufbach). The 13.7-kilometer (8.5 mi) creek rises in the foothills of the Taunus southwest of Schlangenbad-Bärstadt. It flows past Eltville-Martinsthal and the Walluf district of Oberwalluf, flowing into the Rhine at Niederwalluf.

=== Neighbouring communities ===
Walluf borders in the north and east on the boroughs of Schierstein and Frauenstein of the district-free city of Wiesbaden and in the west on the town of Eltville. In the south, the Rhine forms the boundary with the community of Budenheim (Mainz-Bingen in Rhineland-Palatinate).

== History ==
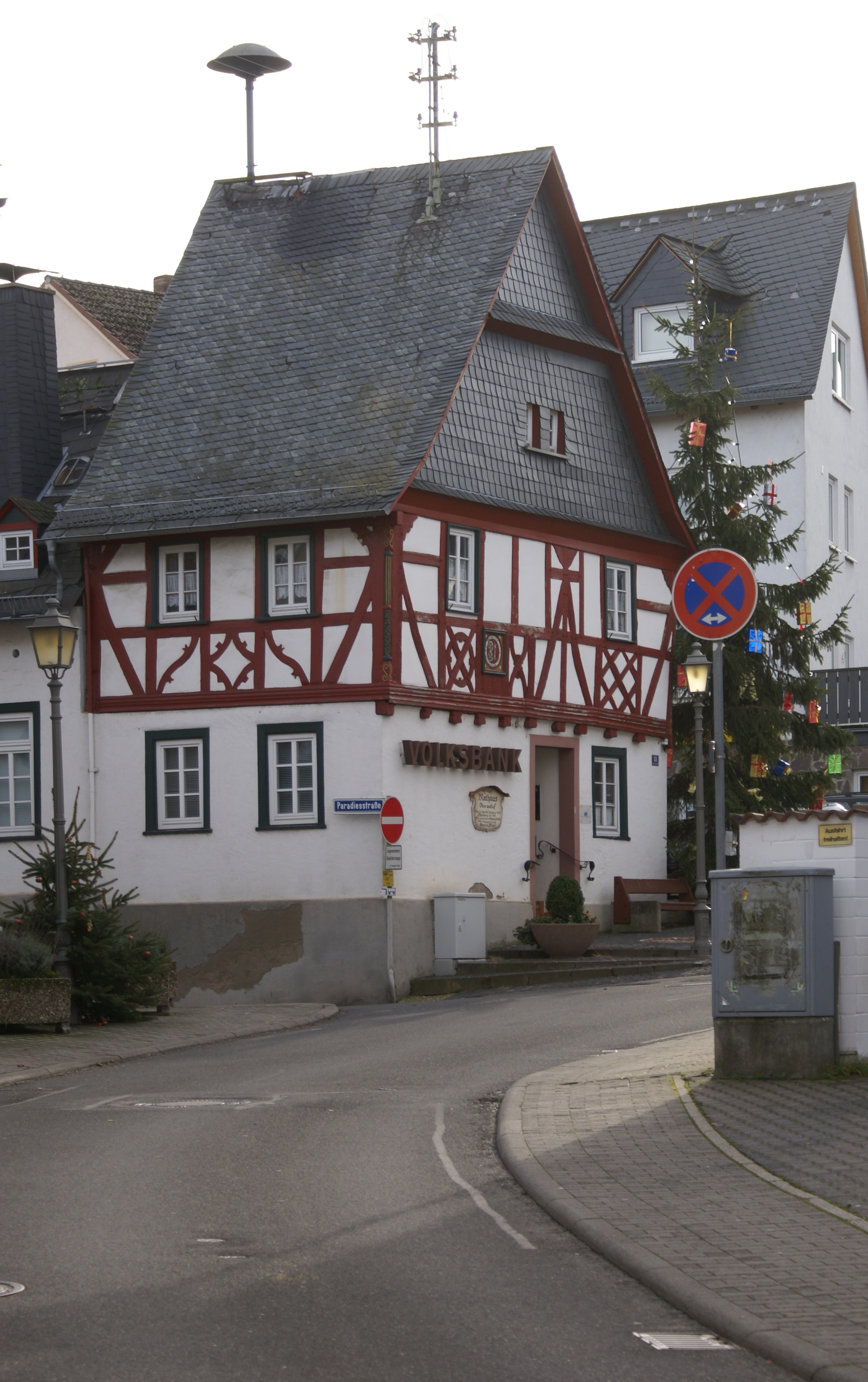
Old Town Hall in Oberwalluf

In 1932, in the immediate vicinity of the so-called Johannisfeld below the ruins of St Johns Church (Johanniskirche), the remains of a characteristic Ottonian tower castle were excavated. The investigations also revealed traces of Celtic, Roman, and Carolingian settlements as well as a royal palace (Pfalz). Pottery fragments attest to settlement as early as the La Tène period (from around 400 BC).

Walluf was first mentioned in writing in 770 under the name Waltaffa. Viticulture has been practiced there since that time, making Walluf the oldest wine-growing community in the Rheingau. In this earliest surviving documentary reference, it is not clearly established whether the later Niederwalluf or Oberwalluf is meant; the designation Nidenwaldoff does not appear until 1304.

The first mention of a church or chapel dates from the time of the Archbishop of Mainz, Willigis (975–1011). The original St John's Church was built around the year 1000 but today survives only as a ruin. It is possible that a church or baptistery already existed at this site in 744, as tradition names the location as the place of baptism of the later Benedictine monk Gerhardus, who received the name “Fidelis” at his baptism. St John's Church remained the parish church of Walluf until 1719.

The exact date of construction of the Walluf tower castle in Niederwalluf is unknown; however, its origin is also presumed to be around the year 1000.

In the early Middle Ages, the area of present-day Walluf was politically divided. Only the western part of the settlement near today’s parish church belonged from the outset to the Rheingau and was under the authority of the Archbishopric of Mainz. The larger portion lay originally east of the Walluf stream and did not belong to the Rheingau but to the Königssondergau. This area later passed into the possession of the Counts of Lindau. Here began the Rheingau Gebück, the Rheingau landwehr established by the Archbishops of Mainz, consisting of an impenetrable hedge. One of the most important routes into the Rheingau passed through Walluf. Its passage through the Gebück was formed by a heavily fortified gate structure known as the “Backofen” (“oven”) because of its shape. For this reason, Walluf is also known as the “Gateway to the Rheingau”.

In the 11th century, another settlement developed above the village, later becoming the independent municipality of Oberwalluf. The older settlement on the Rhine was later called Niederwalluf; the designation Nidenwaldoff is documented only from 1304 onward. The name Waldaffo Superior has been recorded since 1211.

Originally, the settlement east of the Walluf stream was located around the present-day ruins of St John's Church and the tower castle, but it appears to have been relocated to the western side under the protection of the Rheingau Gebück as early as the 12th century. As a result, what later became Niederwalluf became part of the Electorate of Mainz’s Rheingau territory.

After the expansion of the Adelheid Chapel—probably built in the 13th century and now the parish church of St John the Baptist—it was consecrated in 1314. The church rests on Gothic foundations. From that time onward, religious life shifted to the church located further west and more centrally within the village.

The town hall of the formerly independent municipality of Oberwalluf was first constructed in 1412 and rebuilt in 1616. It has survived to the present day. Its façade displays the coat of arms of Oberwalluf, featuring the Mainz Wheel on the left and a key on the right.

Also noteworthy in Oberwalluf is the parish church of St. Martin, which has housed the valuable penitential garment of Saint Elizabeth of Thuringia since 1803.

Following the dissolution of the Electorate of Mainz, the village passed to Nassau-Usingen in 1803 and, during the period of the Duchy of Nassau, belonged to the Eltville administrative district and later to the Rheingau district.

The Protestant Church of the Redeemer (Heilandskirche) was built in 1902.

During the National Socialist dictatorship, the Wilde dental factory from Niederwalluf operated a company labor camp for forced female laborers in the Grüner Wald inn in Oberwalluf. On 1 April 1943, the camp was occupied by 16 women.

As part of the municipal territorial reform in Hesse, the previously independent municipalities of Niederwalluf and Oberwalluf were merged on 1 October 1971 to form the new municipality of Walluf. Local districts (Ortsbezirke), which would have been possible under the Hessian Municipal Code, were not established.

On 15 December 1988, severe gas explosions shook a residential area of the village. The cause was a gas leak in the supply network, resulting from a switching error that allowed gas to be fed from the long-distance supply network at excessive pressure. Two people were killed in the explosions, and several others were injured. Around 200 residents had to be evacuated for several days.

The historic center of Niederwalluf has repeatedly been flooded by severe high waters. The highest water levels were recorded in February 1970, March 1988, and January 1995. Residential buildings located close to the Rhine could be accessed for days only via temporarily constructed walkways or by inflatable boats.

== Infrastructure and economy ==
=== Transport ===
Walluf lies on the East Rhine railway (Rechte Rheinstrecke) running between Koblenz and Wiesbaden. At Niederwalluf railway station, Regionalbahn trains from the DB Regio AG stop.

Likewise running along the Rhine's right (east) bank is Bundesstraße 42, which merges into Autobahn 66 just past the community's eastern limits. From Bundesstraße 42, Bundesstraße 260 branches into the Taunus.

A foot passenger and bicycle ferry operates across the Rhine between Walluf and the Budenheim quay.

=== Education ===
- Walluftalschule (primary school and Hauptschule with orientation level)
- 3 kindergartens (2 in Niederwalluf, 1 in Oberwalluf)

=== Economy ===
Several companies in various fields (such as the chemical industry, construction, nurseries, and wine estates) have their headquarters in Walluf. The town administration also desires to expand the industrial park with additional environmentally friendly establishments. For the tourism sector, attractions include the marina (with a base of the German Sailing Association), large stables, a riding hall, a tennis hall, and a sports park in the industrial area.

In the industrial area "Im Grohenstück/In der Rehbach" are trucking companies, as well as establishments producing construction machinery and packaging equipment. There are also various service providers, such as the Customer Service of Siemens Elektrogeräte GmbH, HSGM Heißschneidegeräte und Maschinen GmbH, ASCAD Anwendersoftware GmbH, and ISI Automation GmbH. On the link road "Am Klingenweg" is the so-called press house in which several publishers have their headquarters, and the new building of ENGEL GmbH with its production of small electric motors, precision rotating parts, and electrical systems.

=== Wine ===
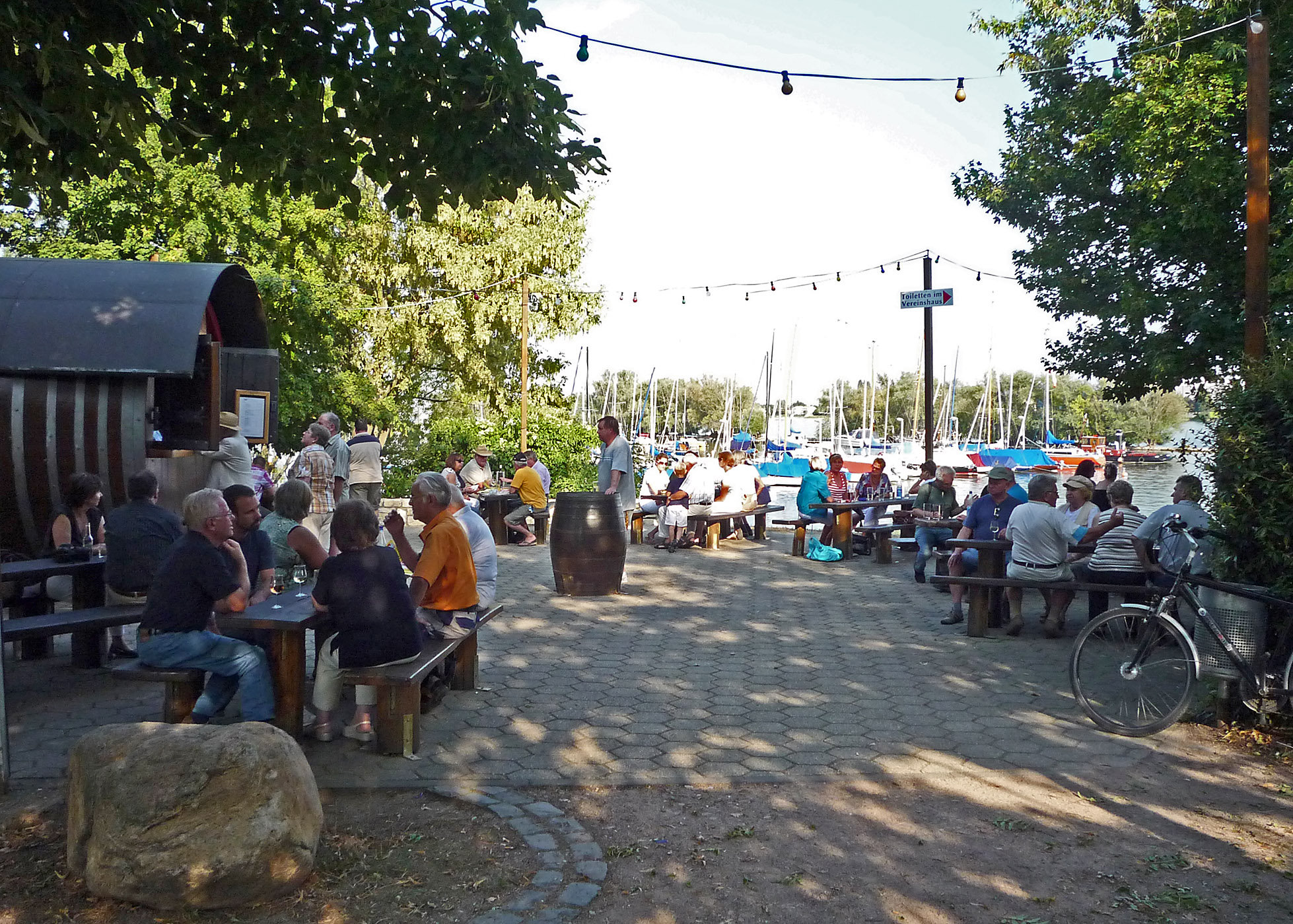
Wine tasting stands Rhine River bank

Walluf is regarded as the oldest wine-growing community in the Rheingau wine region, with numerous Straußwirtschaften and Gutsschänken (estate taverns). Wine is cultivated there on an area of approximately 70 hectares.

Riesling is the predominant grape variety (75–80%), followed by pinot noir (Spätburgunder, 12–13%). Other grape varieties grown on a smaller scale include pinot blanc (Weißburgunder), pinot gris (Grauburgunder), and Müller-Thurgau.

Walluf wines are of outstanding quality. Well-known wine estates include Weingut Bonnet, Weingut Becker, Weingut Mehl, Weingut Russler, Weingut Schweibächer, Weingut Arnet, Weingut Klerner und Erben, Weingut Scherer, and Weingut Bug. Some of these estates also operate Straußwirtschaften or estate taverns, where their own wines and typical Rheingau dishes are served.

Vineyards

The following vineyards, belonging to the Rheingau wine region, are located within the municipal boundaries of Walluf:

- Berg-Bildstock: a larger vineyard site in the north–northwest area of the municipality (18.9 hectares under vine)
- Gottesacker: a historic vineyard named after the Rode Monastery (4.5 hectares)
- Langenstück: also a traditionally cultivated vineyard site (9.8 hectares)
- Oberberg: located in the north–northwest part of the municipality (8.2 hectares)
- Vitusberg: with a high proportion of Riesling; named after Saint Vitus (11.1 hectares)
- Walkenberg / Walkenberger: a well-known single vineyard, also classified as a VDP “Grosse Lage” Walkenberg (18.5 hectares)

== Politics ==
=== Community council ===
The municipal election held on 26 March 2006 yielded the following results:

Parties and voter communities		% 2006	Seats; 2006	% 2001	Seats; 2001
SPD	Social Democratic Party of Germany	38.9	11	39.0	12
CDU	Christian Democratic Union of Germany	33.2	10	33.7	11
BVW	Bürgervereinigung Walluf (Citizens Association of Walluf)	21.2	6	20.5	6
FDP	Free Democratic Party	6.7	2	6.8	2
Total		100.0	29	100.0	31
Voter turnout in %		51.5		57.1	

=== Mayor ===
Mayoral elections are held every six years. The most recent mayors were:

- 2020–incumbent: Nikolaos Stavridis (SPD)
- 2002–2020: Manfred Kohl (SPD)
- 1996–2002: Jürgen Knode (CDU)
- 1994–1996: Heinz Spiekermann (CDU)

=== Town partnerships ===
- La Londe-les-Maures, Var, France

== Culture and sightseeing ==
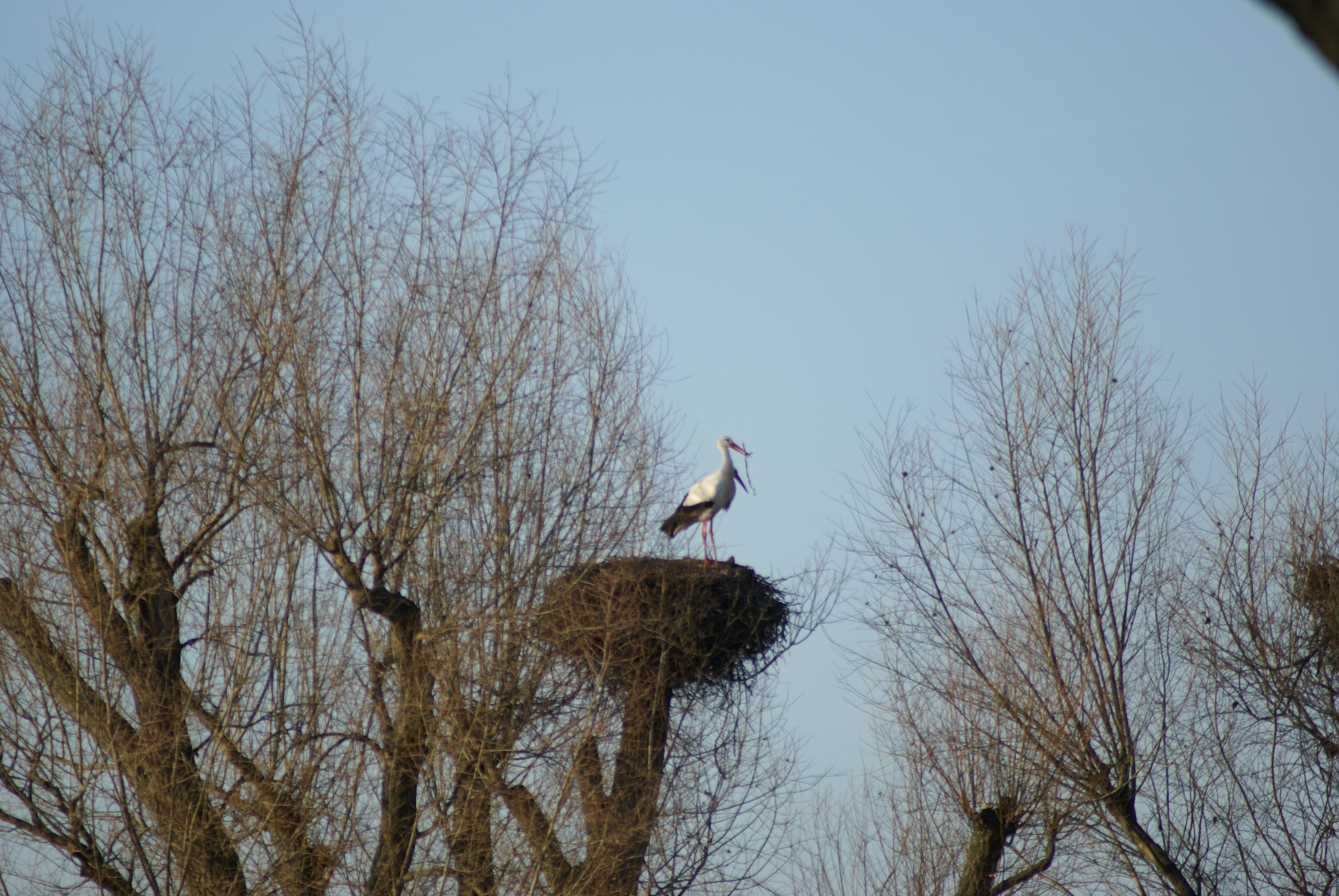
Stork's nest in the Wallufer Bucht

Along the Wallufbach between Niederwalluf and Oberwalluf, there were once numerous mills, of which only remnants remain today. This area between the former villages is now the site of the new centrally located City Hall. An ancient path in the parkland through by the Distrikt Paradies (paradise district) along the Wallufbach combines the two districts.

=== Storks ===
Breeding in the nature conservation area between Walluf and Wiesbaden-Schierstein are 50 white stork pairs, which inhabit Walluf and the surrounding area. These were reinstated here by the Schiersteiner Storchengemeinschaft ("Schierstein Stork Association").

=== Wallufer Turmburg ===
The remains of the Wallufer Turmburg (castle tower) are on the eastern outskirts of Niederwalluf, consisting of not much more than the foundation of a square tower. One well-preserved section of wall is about 10 meters (33 ft) long and 2.20 meters (7.2 ft) thick. Excavations in the area of the castle have indicated that was built in about the 10th century for protection against Norman attacks. Potshards found at the site date to the sixth to ninth centuries. The castle was surrounded by a wall and the tower itself was probably surrounded by a moat. The castle tower was destroyed around 1200 and in 1263 came into possession of Frank von Wiesbaden. It is not known whether the castle tower still stood at this time, but the Knights of Landau already were based about 2 km away at the Hof Armada in Frauenstein. Today, the site is open year-round to visitors and is occasionally used for choir concerts and church services.

=== Johanniskirche (Church of St John) ===
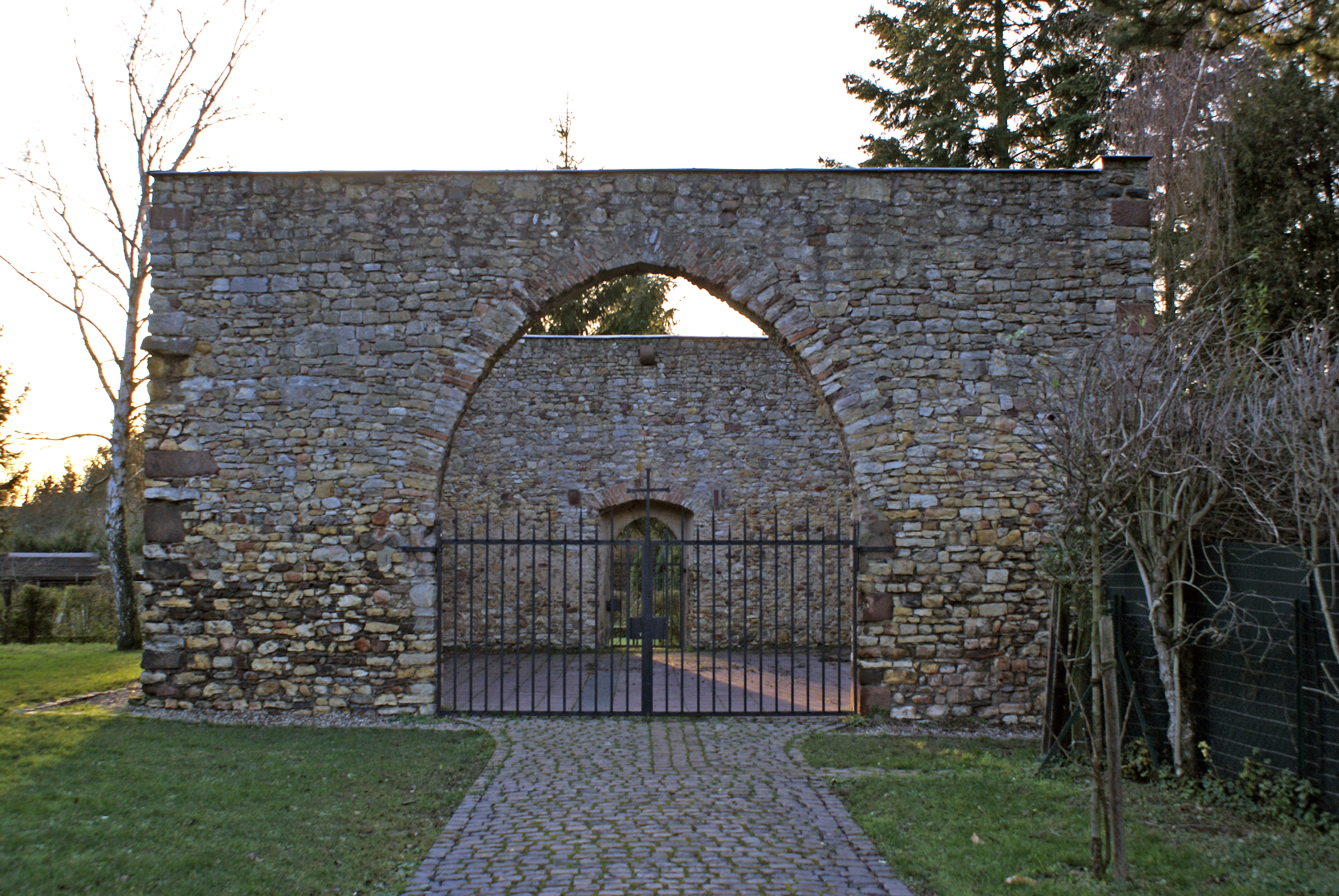
Ruins of the Johanniskirche ("Saint John's Church) in Niederwalluf

The ruins of the Johanniskirche (Church of St John) are east of Niederwalluf. Once the center of the village, the church now consists only of a square of stone walls, measuring about 10.30 m (33.8 ft) by 13 m (43 ft), which date from the end of the 15th to the beginning of the 16th centuries. Its northern wall includes remnants of two previous structures from the 10th and 12th centuries.

The first structure was built by the inhabitants of the nearby castle tower, which dates to the 10th century and lies only a few meters southeast of the church. Built in approximately the year 1000, the original church consisted of a small hall, about 5.8 m (19 ft) by 10 m (33 ft), with an attached square choir (or possibly a tower). It was about 1.8 m (5.9 ft) below the current ground level. The stones of this level have a red color that is evidence of a fire, in which the first church was obviously badly damaged.

In the 12th century (about 1197), the church had apparently become too small and an extension was added on the north end. To connect this addition with the original church, two arched gateways were broken through the northern wall. The stones around these gateways were not laid in conjunction with the original wall, but rather were built onto the old stones. The brighter color of the stones suggests that the arches had been broken through the wall after the fire.

The latest building dates to the 14th century. The original church had apparently been destroyed and was rebuilt, this time at the present ground level. The arches were again closed, but the floor area of the church was increased in the southwest and the walls made higher. Above the level of the first two buildings, one can see finely carved gray stones, which came from a quarry in Oppenheim and had apparently been taken from the castle tower (which had been destroyed around 1220). The last building initially had circular windows. Their irregular outbreak traces are evident in the high Gothic windows, which were built later (around 1500 to 1508).

The building served Niederwalluf as the parish church until the 18th century, even though, by this time, the village itself had migrated to the west, on the other side of the Wallufbach. In the mid-18th century, the people of Niederwalluf built a new chapel, the Adelheidkapelle, in the center of the village and dedicated it also to St. John the Baptist. The altars and artistic objects from the old parish church were transferred there. From the beginning of the 19th century, the original church, badly damaged in the war of 1793–95, was abandoned. It served only as a barn and ice cellar.

In his sketch book of 1813, the Mainz painter Caspar Schneider (1755–1839) portrayed the Church of St. John's in a westward-looking view of Niederwalluf. In the foreground of the sketch is a rubble mound under which the castle tower is buried. The small church is in a ruined state. A remainder of the plaster can also be discerned on north interior wall and the outer walls and the late Gothic tracery of the window is only partially damaged. A high arch is shown in the east wall. It had been made for a choir addition that was never completed and had been only sealed with a temporary wall of inferior construction until the church's destruction. The sketch also shows the remains of part of the high steep roof, which had once been crowned by a small bell tower.

It was probably the Johanniskirche which Johann Wolfgang von Goethe described in 1814, during a visit to the Rheingau: "Nearby there is a ruined chapel, which sits on a green mat with its green ivy-covered walls standing wonderfully clean, simple and pleasant."

Dr. Ferdinand Kutsch (1889–1972), director of the Museum Wiesbaden, conducted excavations in the area of the Johanniskirche in 1931 and 1932. Buried remains of the old castle tower were rediscovered and the previously unknown architectural history of the church was reconstructed.

Some restoration of the church was done in the 1970s. In 2000, at the initiative of Elmar Lorey, the Kulturinitiative Alte Johanniskirche eV (Old St. John's Church Culture Initiative) was founded to organize events for enrichment of the cultural life of Walluf. The town rehabilitated the Johanniskirche remains for use as a cultural event venue. A line of dark stones in the newly introduced floor shows the course of the first structure's walls. Outside the north wall, another line of paving stones indicates the walls of the second construction.

=== Churches ===
Currently there are two Roman Catholic churches in Walluf (one in Niederwalluf and one in Oberwalluf) and one Protestant church in Niederwalluf.

- Church of St. John the Baptist (St. Johannes der Täufer), Niederwalluf – Documentary evidence shows that the dedication of the present church was in 1314. The foundations of the church are Gothic. The oldest part of the church is the chancel, which probably goes back to the Adelheid (nobility) chapel built in the 13th century. The Adelheid chapel probably originally extended right and left one street over, on a street which is still named "Kirchgasse" today.

Between 1648 and 1649, the Adelheid chapel was extended on side of the church facing the village, up to where a small annex now stands. In 1718 there was another widening of the church, in which the three windows on the Rhine-facing side were added. Two of the windows bear an inscription with the year of construction that indicates the work was overseen by Peter Kirn. Inside the church on the same side there is a marble panel, which also names Kirn as overseer of the construction which added to the area of the existing church by a third. The last addition was completed in 1954–55 after plans of the architects Paul and Fritz Johannbroer.

The Baroque high altar was probably a later gift, since it is too high for the Gothic chancel. On the two sides were altars to the Virgin Mary and Saint Joseph dating to 1659 and 1661, respectively. Saint Joseph is the patron saint of Niederwalluf. Until the beginning of the 20th century, a wooden figure of Mary treading on the Serpent stood in the Marian altar. Until 1907, a Baroque figure with Joseph with the Child stood in the Joseph's altar. When the statue of Mary was replaced by a portrayal of her as mother with her child, the figure of Joseph was replaced by one without the child. The two older figures, together with one of Saint Nicholas, are still visible on podiums at the Rhine side of the church.

The pulpit dates to 1603. On its panel is a depiction of a marsh alive with vipers – the crest of Niederwalluf. Over the crest are three flowers and the year 1576. The old baptismal font also dates to 1603. The two paintings Birth of Christ and Presentation of the Lord are works of Rhenish peasant art. The school and dating of the painting Assumption of Mary into Heaven cannot be ascertained. The Wooden Pietà has stood since about 1700. On its back is the emblem of the Crusaders. The church received new windows in 1968. The organ was built in 1978 by the Förster & Nicolaus Company.

- Church of Saint Martin, Oberwalluf – The parish of Saint Martin in Oberwalluf has, since 1803, possessed a valuable relic: the Bußgewand (penance garment) of Saint Elizabeth of Thuringia. The Bußgewand, made from coarse linen, dates back to 1225 and according to legend was a gift to Elizabeth from Francis of Assisi. The church displays it once a year. It had previously been located in the Tiefenthal monastery, after knights of the Teutonic Order (who considered Elizabeth their patron saint) had brought the object from Marburg to the Rheingau. After the secularization of the Tiefenthal monastery, the Bußgewand came to Oberwalluf.
- Church of the Savior (German Heilandskirche) is the house of worship for more than 2100 Protestants in Walluf, Martinsthal and Rauenthal. It was founded in 1902 when Protestants in Oberwalluf and Niederwalluf numbered only 261. Ground was broken on a parcel of land called the "Vorderer Galgengipfel" ("Front Gallows Summit") on 2 May 1902, the 100th-anniversary of the Tolerance Edict of the Rheingau. Construction was completed in just six months and the solemn inauguration was held on 26 October that year.

The architect of the church was Ludwig Hofmann, born in Herborn. He described the construction style as "Early Gothic", which is most recognizable in the big window groups to the left and right. The small church was built for about 200 visitors, 164 in the nave and 30 in the organ loft.

The walls are made of stone, primarily quartzite from a quarry in Schlangenbad. The edges of the walls, windows and pinnacles are made of yellow and red sandstone. The building materials and style of the towers give it a fortified, castle-like appearance. Inside, the walls are plastered and painted. The original painting was reproduced as part of a thorough renovation in 1993. The painted frieze is crowned with a crenellated band made of tin, again giving the impression of a castle.

The chancel window depicts the patron of the Church, the Risen Christ. The representation, in the style of the Middle Ages, depicts Jesus as Savior, standing returned from the dead on the stone rolled away from the tomb. All of the windows were restored in 2005.

The altar, pulpit and baptismal font created by Walluf stoneworkers. The Gothic crucifix above the altar is much older than the church itself, made around 1470 in Oberfranken. The organ was made in 1904 by the Raßmann company in Möttau. For space reasons, the organ loft is only accessible from the outside via a narrow spiral staircase in a stair tower. Three bells hang in the bell tower, ringing daily at 12:00 and 6:00 p.m., in addition to ringing before Sunday services.

=== Mills ===
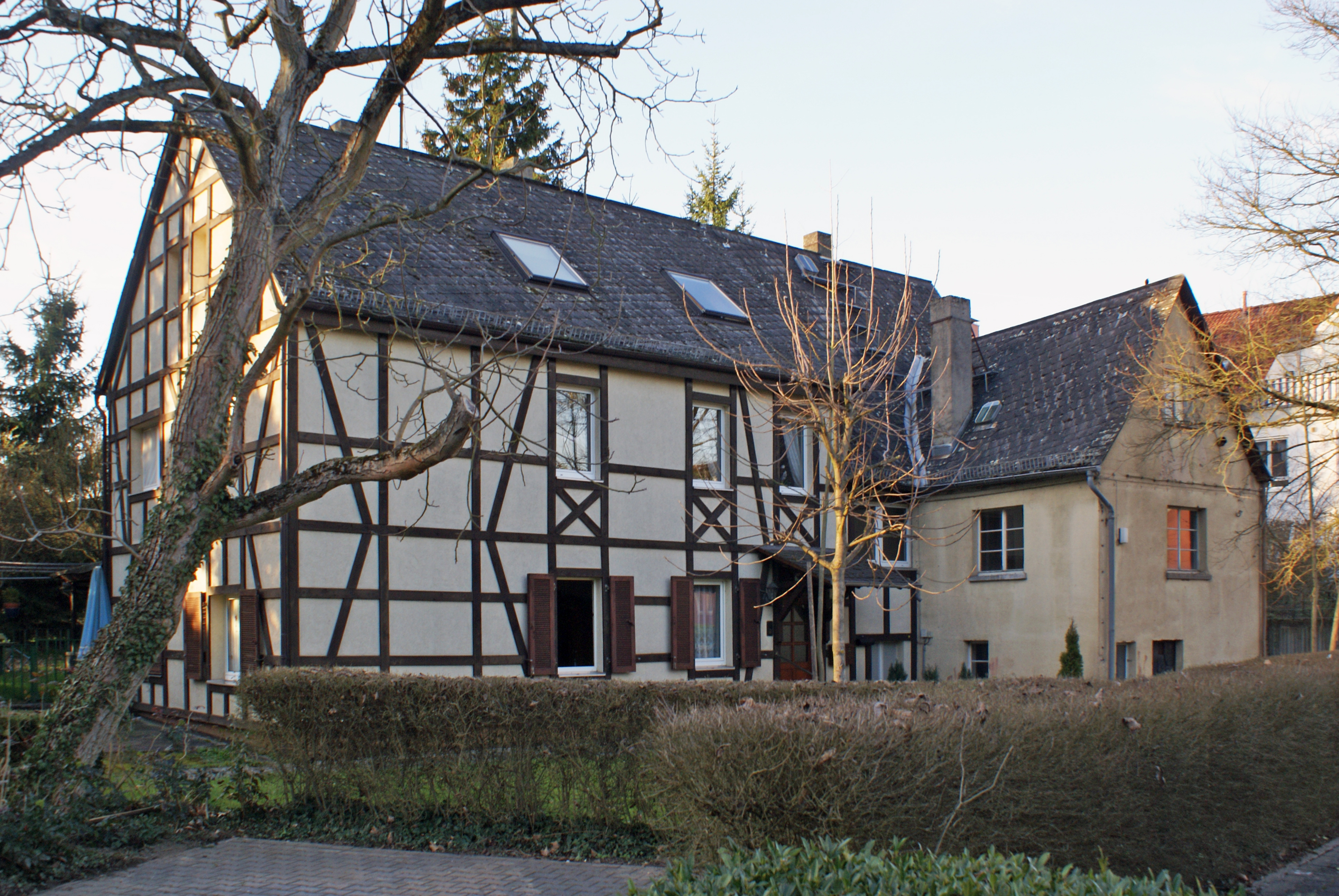
Kirchner-Mühle in Niederwalluf

A number of former watermills (German Mühle) along the Walluf millrace today recall the community's early economic development:

- Kirchner-Mühle – The building year is unknown. In 1696, Lieutenant Colonel von Wonsheim was the owner; the leaseholder was Anton Becker. The mill already had two millstones at its disposal and could daily grind ten Malter of grain. In 1699 it was noted as the fourth mill in Walluf's municipal area. Later owners were the Baroness von Boos, née von Greiffenclau in 1775 and the Count of Eltz in 1798. In 1799, Johann Boltner bought the mill at auction, and the leaseholders that followed were Adam Farfort in 1822, Heinrich Zimmermann in 1839, and his widow and son Heinrich in 1854. Johann Kirchner acquired the property in 1877 and ran a sawmill there. Various business operations followed. After the Wilde tooth factory was closed, the community of Walluf acquired the property, on which the town hall is now found.

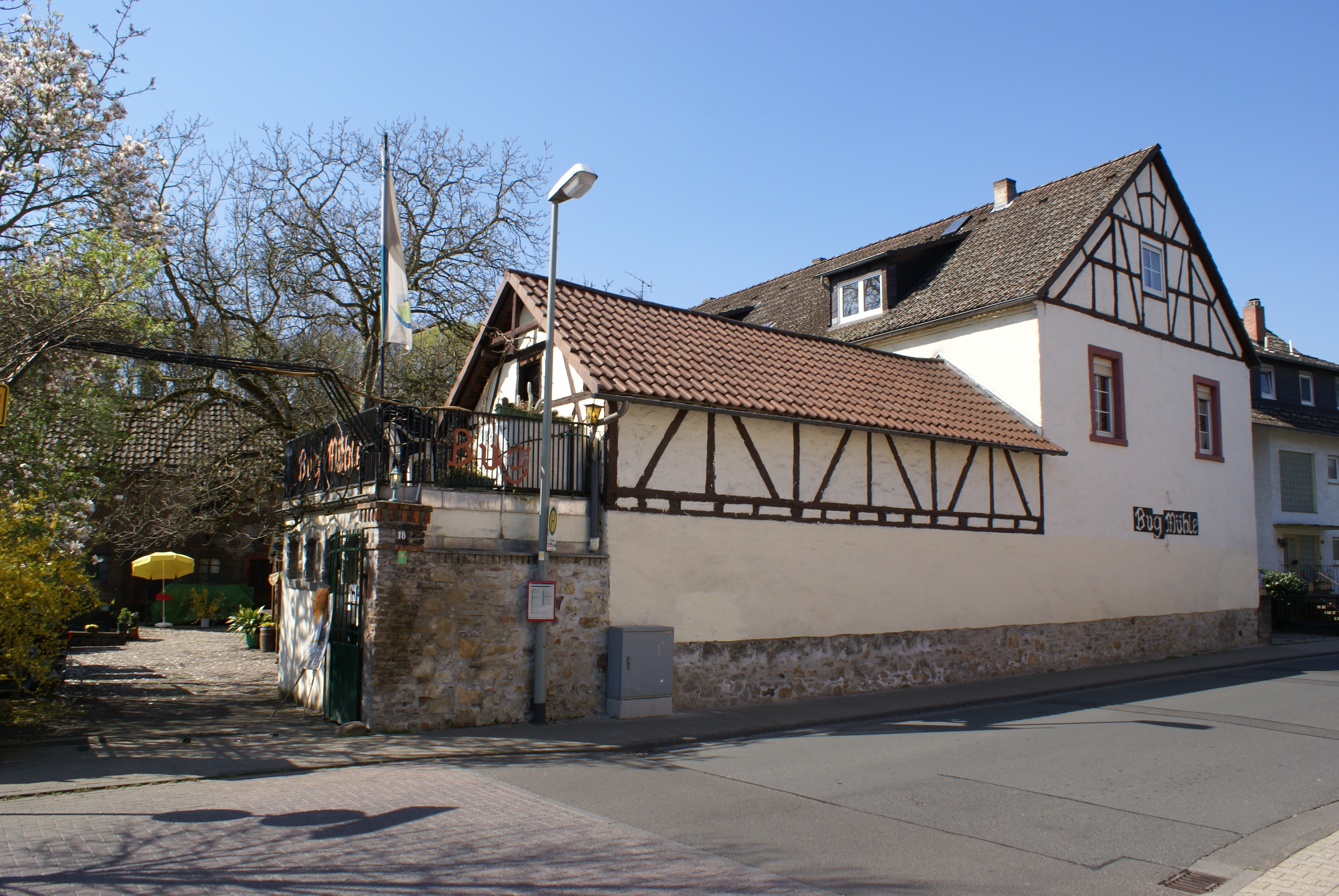
Bug-Mühle in Niederwalluf

- Bug-Mühle – This mill was built before 1393. It was mentioned as the middle mill at Niederwalluf and earlier had belonged to Dyle Welker von Königstein. St. Peter's Monastery in Mainz let the mill in 1393 to Heicze, called von dem Berge ("From the Mountain"), and Arnold von Montabaur. Both were weavers. In 1696, the mill was outfitted as a tanning mill. Ownership was held by Hartmann Scheider, a tanner from Mainz. In 1711, Nikolaus Behringer acquired the property from Baumann's heirs. The mill was then converted into a flour mill. In 1818, Wendel Bug appeared in a document as the mill's owner. Since this time, the mill has been in the Bug family's ownership. Until 1905, it was outfitted as a gristmill. As one of the few intact mills on the Walluf millrace, the Bug Mill still has an operational waterwheel.

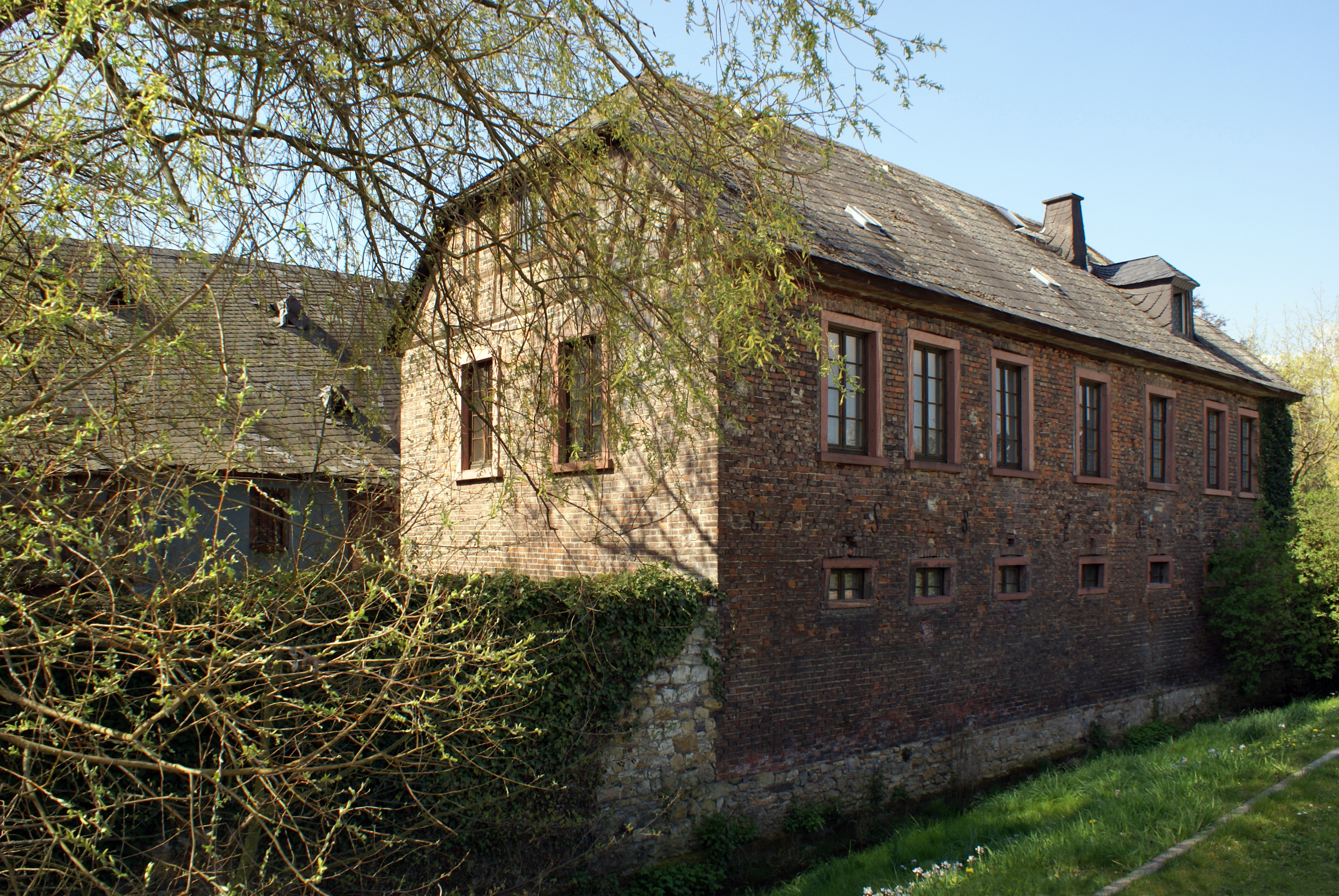
Hild-Mühle ("Mühle der Schönen Künste") in Niederwalluf

- Hild-Mühle (Mühle der Schönen Künste) – Built in 1715 by the miller Johann Koch from Kiedrich, this mill has at its disposal two millwheels and a husking mill. In 1746, Johann Backhaus was mentioned as the miller. In 1799, St. Peter's Monastery in Mainz sold the mill to Peter Wilhelm Arnet. A bakehouse was mentioned as being here for the first time in 1822. Ownership changed hands in quick succession: 1828 Georg Kindlinger, 1832 Johann Gehm, and 1855 miller and baker Johann Arnet. By marriage into the family, ownership of the mill property passed to Caspar J. Hild. As of 1920 and until after the Second World War, a breadmaking operation was run here. Milling came to an end about 1940. The property, now under protection as a monument, was abandoned for many years and fell into disrepair. Today the Mühle der Schönen Künste ("Mill of Fine Arts") is a place for cultural events.

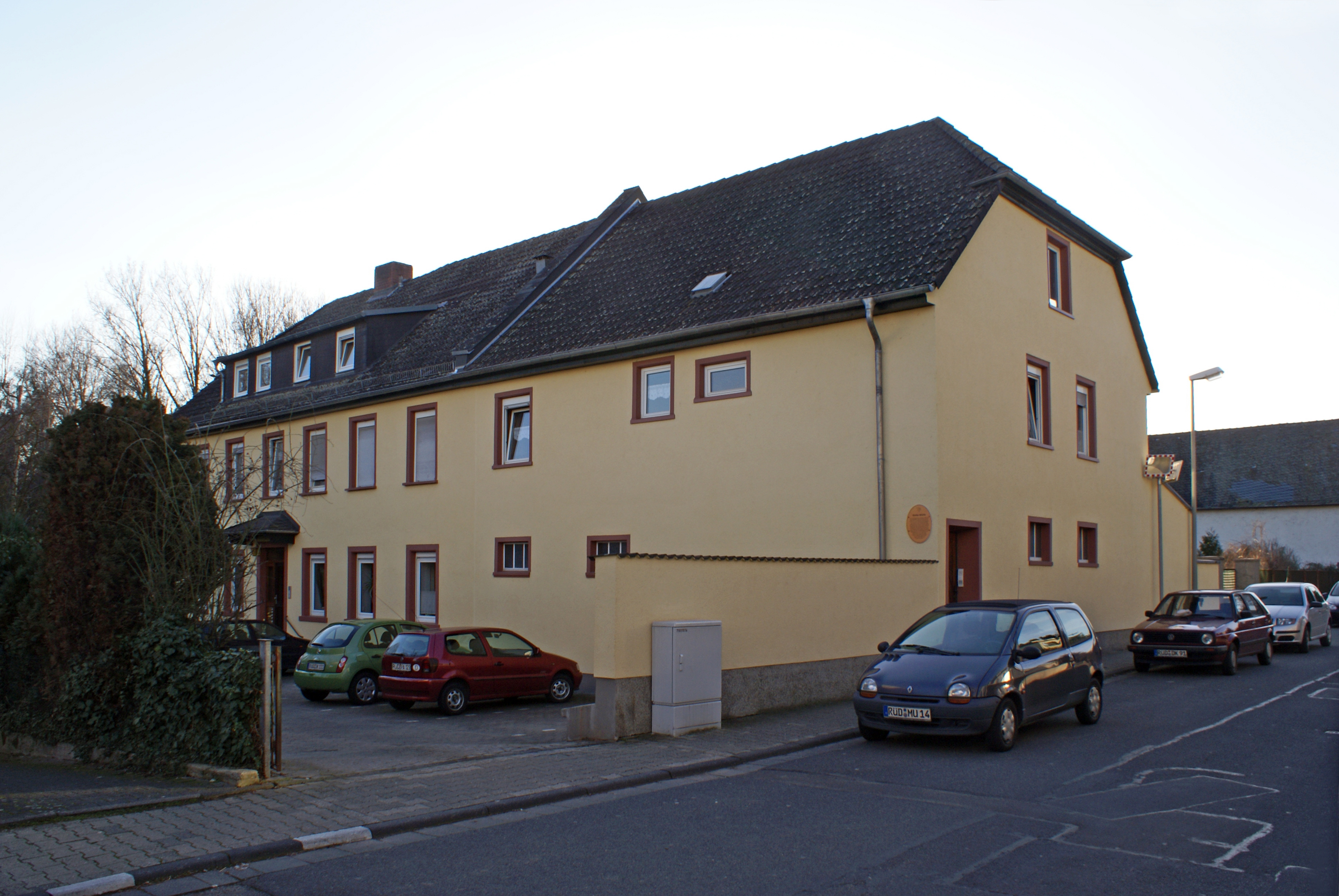
Weller-Mühle in Niederwalluf

- Weller-Mühle – The building year is unknown. In 1699 a tanning mill was mentioned. This had earlier been a cloth fulling mill and was converted into a leather mill by Peter Fritz. In 1711 it was converted yet again into a gristmill. In 1716 it was in the Senft family's ownership and in 1718 it passed to Friedrich Kippenberger. Later, the mill was mentioned as being owned by the Specht noble family and it passed into the Körber family's ownership. In 1818 it was being run by G. Friedrich Körber. In 1855 the mill had at its disposal two millstones with a running time of about six months. Milling came to an end about 1880. By marriage into the family, ownership of the property passed in 1912 to Michael Weller and later to the Jost family.

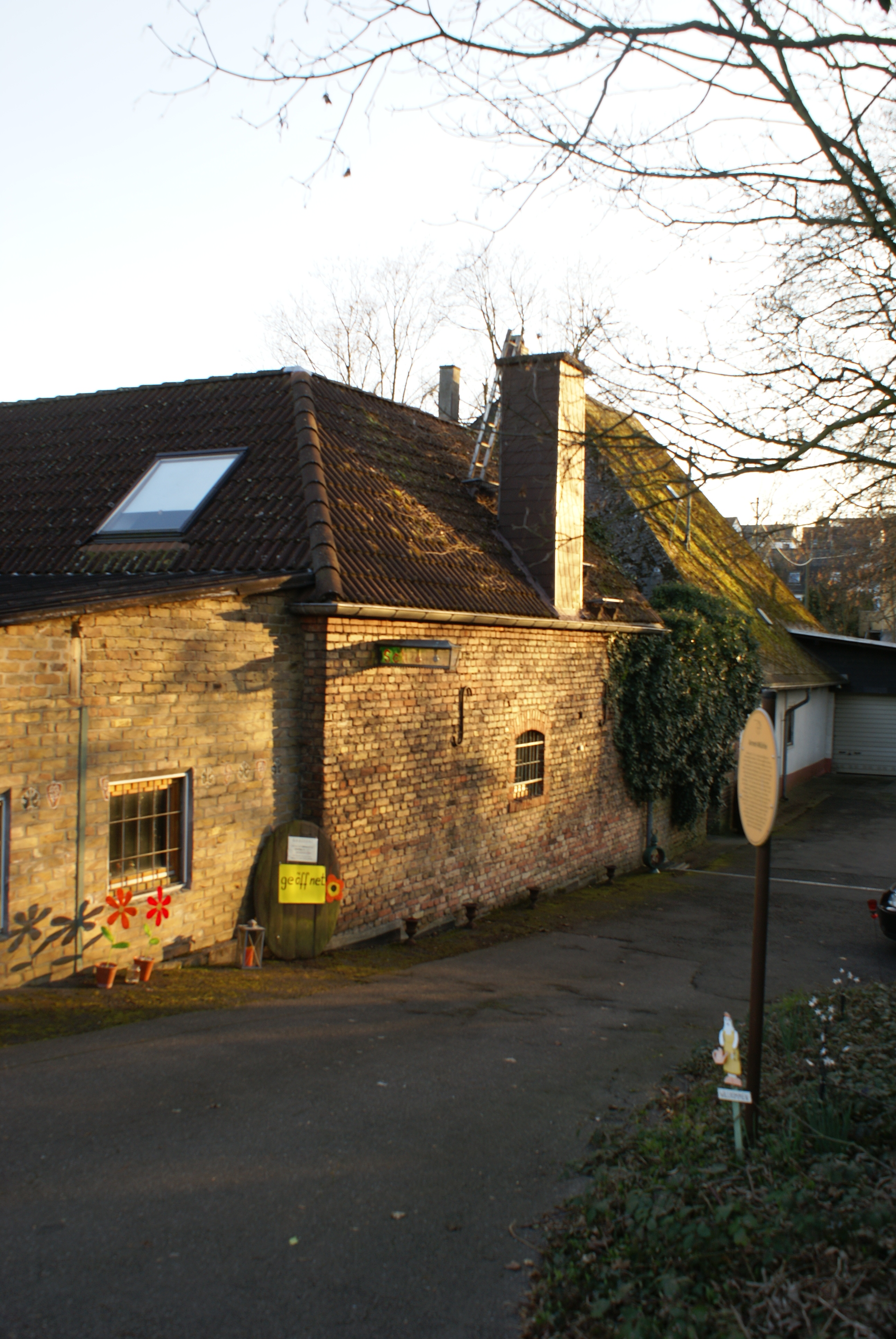
Arnet-Mühle in Oberwalluf

- Arnet-Mühle – Earlier names for this mill were, for example, Lerchi'sche Mühle, Kurfürsten-Mühle and Israels-Mühle. As early as the 13th century, a mill was mentioned in Oberwalluf. In 1662, Elector Johann Phillip von Mainz acquired the mill from Anna Kunigunde von Heynenberg. It had a fulling and milling operation. The property lay outside the Gebück (border fortification). For a long time, the fulling mill was run by Mainz woollen weavers. In 1701, a miller named Kritter took over the mill and outfitted it with a fulling and flour mill, two millstones and a husking mill. In 1745, Andreas Israel bought the mill at auction and in 1755, Peter Bischof became the owner. In this time the mill was converted into an oil and flour mill. Johann Fieder took the mill over in 1794. By marriage into the family, the mill property passed to Georg Josef Arnet, whose family still owns the mill today.
- Diefenbach-Mühle - The exact building year is unknown. In 1671 it was mentioned as belonging to the Junker Molsberger from Bodenheim. It lay in the Flecken beim Backofen ("Spot Near the Oven") in the Lindau court district, and had the distinction of being the only mill on the Wallufbach that had an undershot waterwheel, meaning that it could not run in times of high water. About 1850 or 1860, the master carpenter Diefenbach acquired the mill and used the waterpower to run his woodworking machines. The water for running the mill was brought to the mill through a separate race from the Wallufbach. The waterwheel was found at the back of the building. After changing ownership, the mill was eventually acquired by the Jansen family as a residential and business building in 1957.
- Dickescheidt-Mühle – Mentioned as early as about 1200, this is likely the oldest flour mill in the Walluf valley. In 1274, the mill was recorded in the Mainz Cathedral Foundation's records as a mill with a bakehouse. In 1321 it passed from Saint Peter's Monastery in Mainz to the resident knight from Lindau. By marriage into the family, the mill passed into the hands of the Knights of Goroth in the early 17th century. For centuries, noble families decided the mill's fate. In the early 19th century, it passed into commoners' hands (Kron family, about 1818 Paul Korn). The flour mill had at its disposal two millstones with a running time of six months. About 1894 or 1895 came a shift in use to industrial operations. In 1922, Josef Dickescheidt became the new owner. The waterwheel had a diameter of 3.00 m and a breadth of 1.70 m. It performed at about 8 horsepower, and was disused in 1956. The property was torn down in 1978.

== Sports ==
SG Walluf
- Full name: Sportgemeinschaft Walluf e.V. 1932
- Founded: 30 January 1932
Home colours	Away colours

Two football clubs are based in Walluf, SG Walluf 1932 e.V. and FSV Oberwalluf 1951 e.V..

As of the 2008–2009 season, SG Walluf competes in the Verbandsliga Hessen-Mitte (the second-highest level in the state). The club won the league title in 2000, earning promotion to the Oberliga Hessen (now the Hessenliga). After two seasons in the Oberliga, they were again relegated to the Verbandsliga.

FSV Oberwalluf competes in the Rheingau-Taunus-Kreis Kreisliga A. Both clubs play at the sporting ground in the Johannisfeld on the Rhine.

== Famous residents ==
Walluf is hometown to the comic character "Karl – der Spätlesereiter", a legendary character in the story of how Spätlese wines began.
