= Königssondergau =

Frankish gau in modern-day Hesse, Germany

The Königssondergau (German for "King's Special District") was a Frankish gau (district) which existed in the area north of the confluence of the Rhine and Main rivers in Germany, from Frankish times until the end of the 12th century. Often mistakenly equated with the Rheingau, the Gau was based around the former Roman administrative district of Civitas Mattiacorum. The name Kunigessuntera is documented the first time in 819. A main court (fiscus) with senior officials were present in Wiesbaden; sub-courts existed in Biebrich and Mosbach (now part of Biebrich).

The Gau probably had already been created by the beginning of the reign of Charlemagne (after 771) as the private property of the Frankish king and his heirs. This was the former Alemannic Rheingau divided into three sections - the Königssondergau was now between the Lower Rheingau (which retained the name "Rheingau") and the Upper Rheingau region south of the lower Main.

The Königssondergau originally covered the area bordering on Kemel (now a constituent community of Heidenrod) and Bärstadt (now a constituent community of Schlangenbad) in the west, starting at Walluf, and extending east to Eppstein and Hofheim, with the Kriftel as eastern border. In the north, the Taunus and the former Roman limes formed the border. The southern boundary was the Rhine. The Gau was adjacent in the west to the Lower Rheingau, in the northwest to Niddagau, in the east to the Maingau, and in the southeast to the Upper Rheingau.

The administration of the Königssondergau lay in the hands of the gau counts, whose royal court (curtis) stood near today's Hessian Parliament in Wiesbaden. The tower house, built in the 9th and 10th centuries, was expanded in the Middle Ages into a castle.

The income from the Königssondergau belonged to the Frankish king who used it to finance his court. Parts of the gau areas, villages and castles were given as fiefdoms to reward followers. Over time parts were also given to the Archdiocese of Mainz (e.g. Oestrich, Geisenheim, Rüdesheim am Rhein and Lorch in the Veronese donation of 983 by Emperor Otto II) or sold to other owners. Emperor Otto III donated Biebrich and Mosbach in 991 the Selz monastery in Alsace. Gifts and awards were also given to feudal nobles and counts, and by the 12th Century the House of Nassau held count rights in and around Wiesbaden. Count Henry II of Nassau, 1198–1251, won Wiesbaden and the Königssondergau as imperial fiefdom in 1214. Also, the Lords of Eppstein penetrated by exploiting bailiwick rights, purchase and inheritance in the Königssondergau, where they became opponents of the Counts of Nassau.
