= Frauenstein Castle (Wiesbaden) =

- Burg Frauenstein
- Wiesbaden-Frauenstein
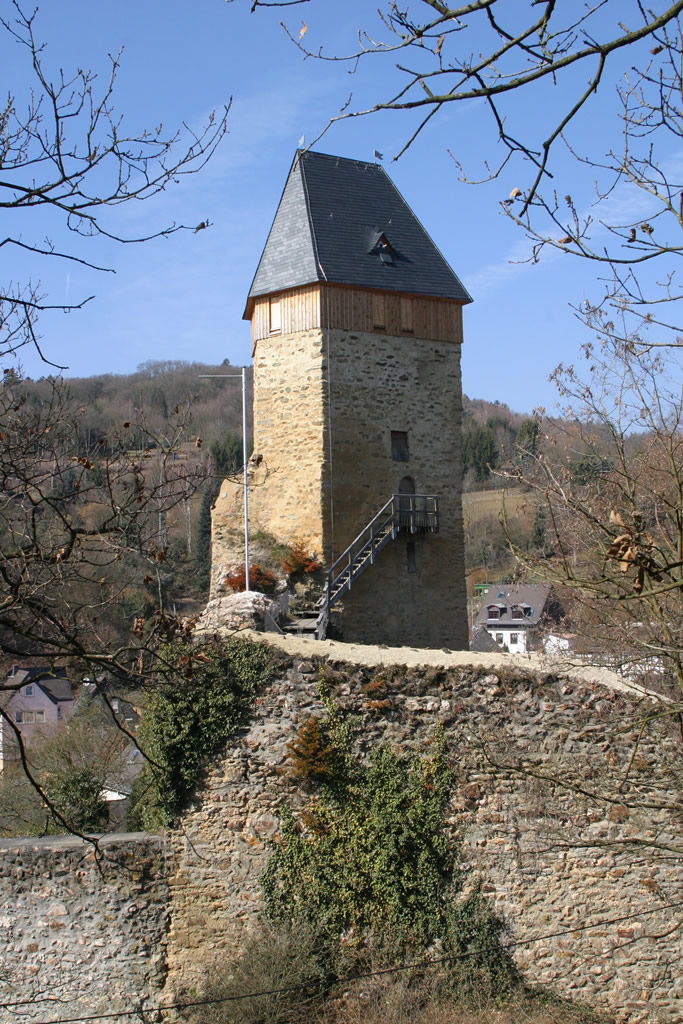

Site information
- Type: Medieval castle

Location
- Coordinates: 50°3′54.5″N 8°9′16.5″E

Site history
- Built: 1180

Frauenstein Castle (German: Burg Frauenstein) is a ruined castle in the town of Wiesbaden-Frauenstein in Hesse, Germany.

It is not known who built Frauenstein Castle, but, based on dendrochronological evidence, its construction has been dated to around 1184. Built on a quartzite outcropping of the Spitzen Stein the castle was not intended as a defensive fortress, but rather as a watch-tower. It also served the tower guards as a dwelling. The construction of the castle with its high walls and battlements gave protection to farmers in the area and led to the emergence of the village of the same name. Later, the castle was extended by a fore-castle with pond, as could be confirmed by excavations in the year 1943.

While the German name Frauen-stein can be translated "women's stone", it actually derives from Vrowenstein, a name which first appears in the historical record in 1221. In that year, a deed names a Heinrich Bodo von Vrowenstein (in 1207/1209, he was mentioned as being from Idstein) as a lord of Frauenstein Castle. In the year 1231, a document of the Erbach monastery mentions a knight by the name of Siegfried von Frauenstein who was a marshal with the bishopric of Mainz. He was a descendant of an aristocratic Schierstein family (which would become extinct in 1380).

Around 1300, Siegfried IV von Frauenstein sold part of the castle, along with surrounding property and its serfs, to Gerhard, the Archbishop of Mainz. Gerhard wanted the castle in order to protect the eastern border of his possessions in the Rheingau against his rival, the Count of Nassau. In May 1301, forces of King Albert of Austria fought against Mainz. They captured all of the fortresses, including Frauenstein, and devastated the Rheingau. The castle was soon restored, however.

In 1310 Johann von Limburg also sold his shares of the castle to the Mainz bishopric so that it had gained full control over the castle by the year 1319. Mainz, however, once again sold parts of the castle so that, by 1390, it possessed only half of the castle. The noble co-owners often settled in Frauenstein and built beautiful half-timbered houses which still stand in the village to the present day.

Over the following centuries, the disputes between Mainz and Nassau continued. Nassau was able to prevent Mainz's possessions in the area from growing by encircling the castle with a chain of five fortified farms: Sommerberg, Rosenkoeppel, Nürnberg, Groroth, and Armada. All of these estates, with the exception of Rosenkoeppel, are still preserved today.

In the second half of the 18th century, the castle lost its significance as border security and was no longer maintained. In the Secularization of 1803, the town was brought under the control of the Count of Nassau and in 1808 the serfs were granted freedom of movement. In 1866, the town - like all of Nassau - came under the control of Prussia.
