= Wiesbaden-Frauenstein =

Frauenstein
- Borough of Wiesbaden
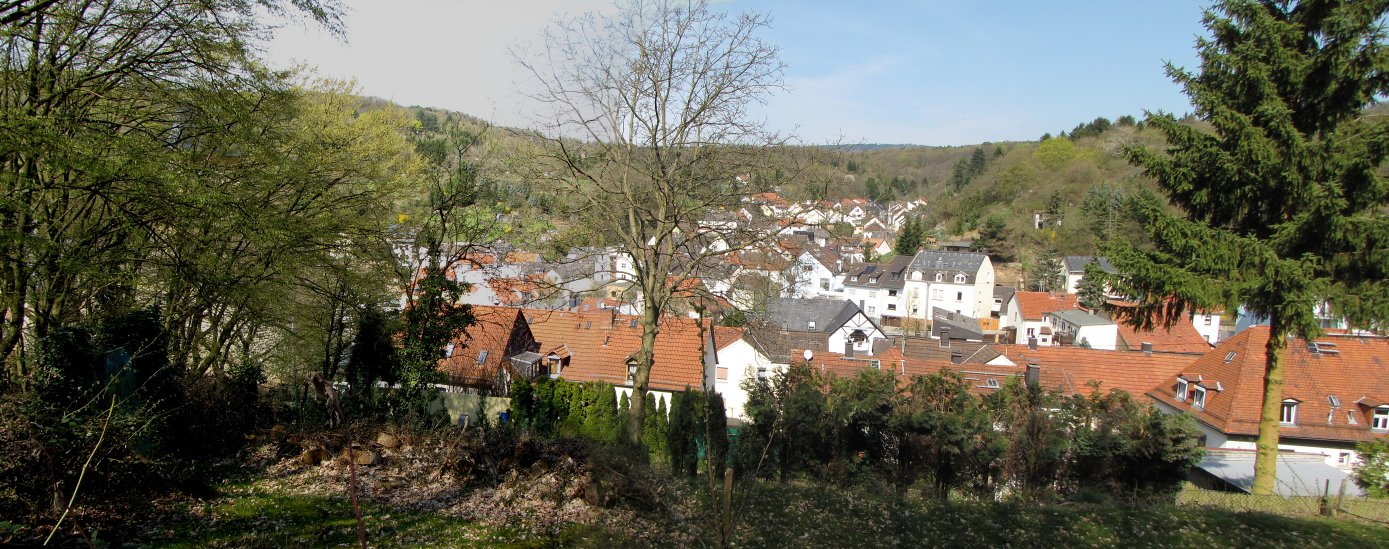

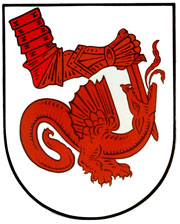
- Coat of arms

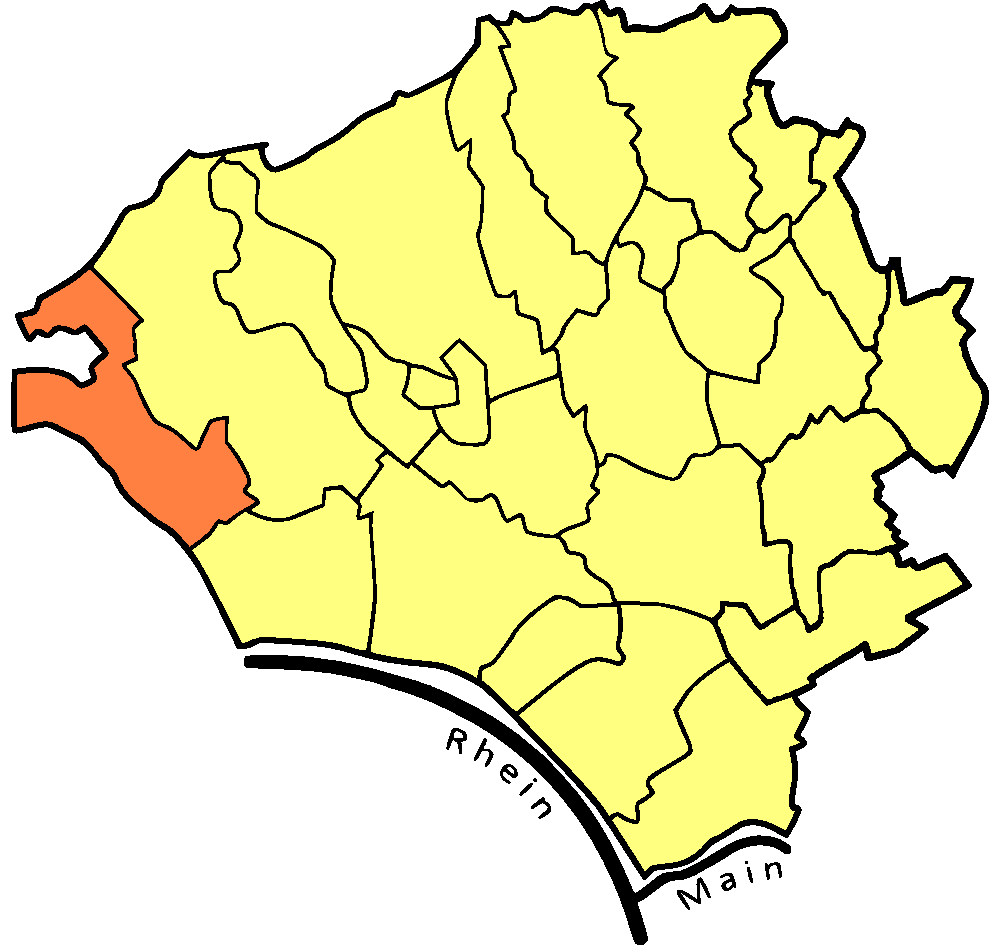
- Location of Frauenstein in Wiesbaden
- Interactive map of Frauenstein
- Location within Germany Location within Hesse
- Coordinates: 50°3′54″N 8°9′14″E
- Country: Germany
- State: Hesse
- District: Urban district
- City: Wiesbaden

Government
  - Mayor: Adolf Lupp (SPD)

Area
  - Total: 10.65 km^{2} (4.11 sq mi)

Population (2020-12-31)
  - Total: 2,382
  - Density: 223.7/km^{2} (579.3/sq mi)
- Time zone: UTC+01:00 (CET)
  - Summer (DST): UTC+02:00 (CEST)
- Postal codes: 65201
- Dialling codes: 0611
- Vehicle registration: WI

Frauenstein (German pronunciation: [ˈfʁaʊənˌʃtaɪn]) is the westernmost borough of the city of Wiesbaden, located in the Rhine Main Area near Frankfurt and capital of the federal state of Hesse, Germany. The borough has a population of approximately 2,400. The formerly independent village was incorporated into Wiesbaden in 1928.

The historic village center is located in the south of the borough. In the center of it are the ruins of a medieval castle, of which the keep still stands. Known as the "Gateway to the Rheingau", the historic village is surrounded by vineyards and fruit orchards. Around late April and early May, its blooming cherry trees make Frauenstein a popular destination.

== Geographical setting ==
Frauenstein borders the Wiesbaden boroughs of Dotzheim to the north and northeast and Schierstein to the southeast. The town of Schlangenbad lies to the west. The Schlangenbad borough of Georgenborn is almost an enclave, bordered to the north, east, and south by Frauenstein.

The historic village center of Frauenstein is situated in a narrow valley formed by two streams, the Lippbach and Katzbach. These are joined by the Erlenbach south of the village center to form the Grorother Bach. The Grorother Bach flows southeast, reaching the Rhine at Schierstein.

A hill called the Spitzen Stein stands just east of the village center. Other nearby high points include Grauerstein (elevation 339 m) to the northwest and Leierkopf (207 m) to the east. The highest point in Frauenstein is Rotekrauzkopf (elevation 509 m) in the far northwest of the borough. The Frauenstein area is home to a population of the Aesculapian Snake, a large, non-venomous snake rare to this area of Europe.

== History ==
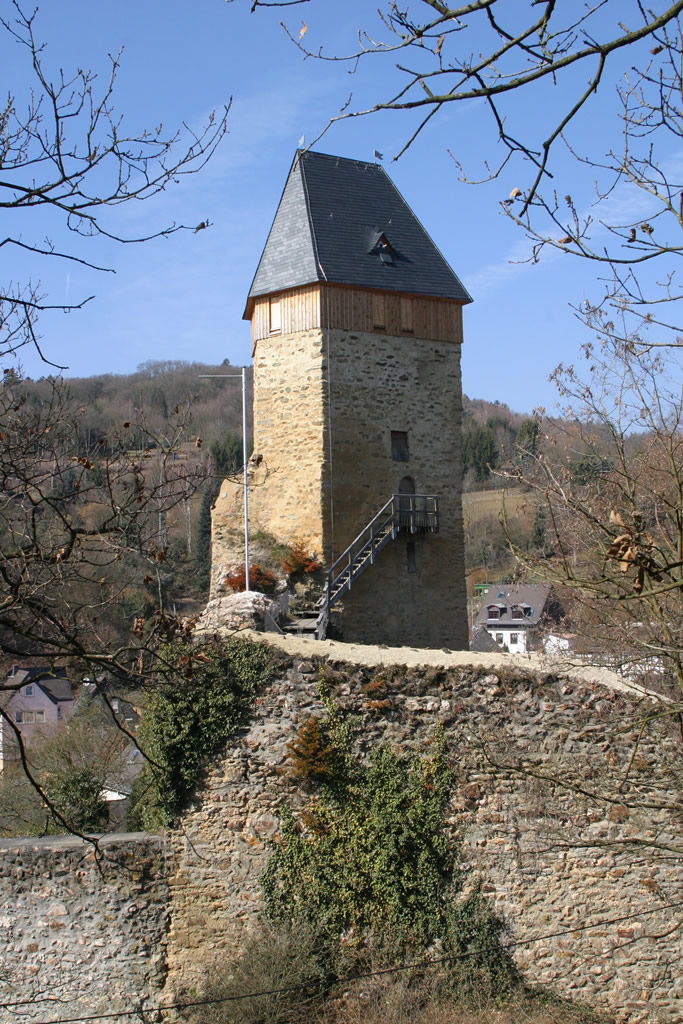
Frauenstein Castle

While the German name Frauen-Stein can be translated "women's stone", it actually derives from Vrowenstein, a name which first appears in the historical record in 1221. In that year, a deed names a Heinrich Bodo von Vrowenstein (in 1207/1209, he was mentioned as being from Idstein) as a lord of Frauenstein Castle. In the year 1231, a document of the Erbach monastery mentions a knight by the name of Siegfried von Frauenstein who was a marshal with the bishopric of Mainz. He was a descendant of an aristocratic Schierstein family (which would become extinct in 1380).

It is not known who built Frauenstein Castle, but, based on dendrochronological evidence, its construction has been dated to around 1184. Built on a quartzite outcropping of the Spitzen Stein the castle was not intended as a defensive fortress, but rather as a watch-tower. It also served the tower guards as a dwelling. The construction of the castle with its high walls and battlements gave protection to farmers in the area and led to the emergence of the village of the same name. Later, the castle was extended by a fore-castle with pond, as could be confirmed by excavations in the year 1943.

Around 1300, Siegfried IV von Frauenstein sold part of the castle, along with surrounding property and its serfs, to Gerhard, the Archbishop of Mainz. Gerhard wanted the castle in order to protect the eastern border of his possessions in the Rheingau against his rival, the Count of Nassau. In May 1301, forces of King Albert of Austria fought against Mainz. They captured all of the fortresses, including Frauenstein, and devastated the Rheingau. The castle was soon restored, however.

In 1310 Johann von Limburg also sold his shares of the castle to the Mainz bishopric so that it had gained full control over the castle by the year 1319. Mainz, however, once again sold parts of the castle so that, by 1390, it possessed only half of the castle. The noble co-owners often settled in Frauenstein and built beautiful half-timbered houses which still stand in the village to the present day.

Over the following centuries, the disputes between Mainz and Nassau continued. Nassau was able to prevent Mainz's possessions in the area from growing by encircling the castle with a chain of five fortified farms: Sommerberg, Rosenkoeppel, Nürnberg, Groroth, and Armada. All of these estates, with the exception of Rosenkoeppel, are still preserved today.

In the second half of the 18th century, the castle lost its significance as border security and was no longer maintained. In the Secularization of 1803, the town was brought under the control of the Count of Nassau and in 1808 the serfs were granted freedom of movement. In 1866, the town - like all of Nassau - came under the control of Prussia.

== Religious life ==
In 1544, the Roman Catholic Archdiocese of Mainz removed Frauenstein from under its parent community of Schierstein and made it an independent parish. The village chapel, built in 1509, was expanded and re-dedicated to St. George and St. Catherine. After secularization, the church received major artworks from the dissolved monasteries, Eberbach Abbey and Tiefenthal, including a Baroque altar. A new church was constructed in 1953 perpendicular to the old church.

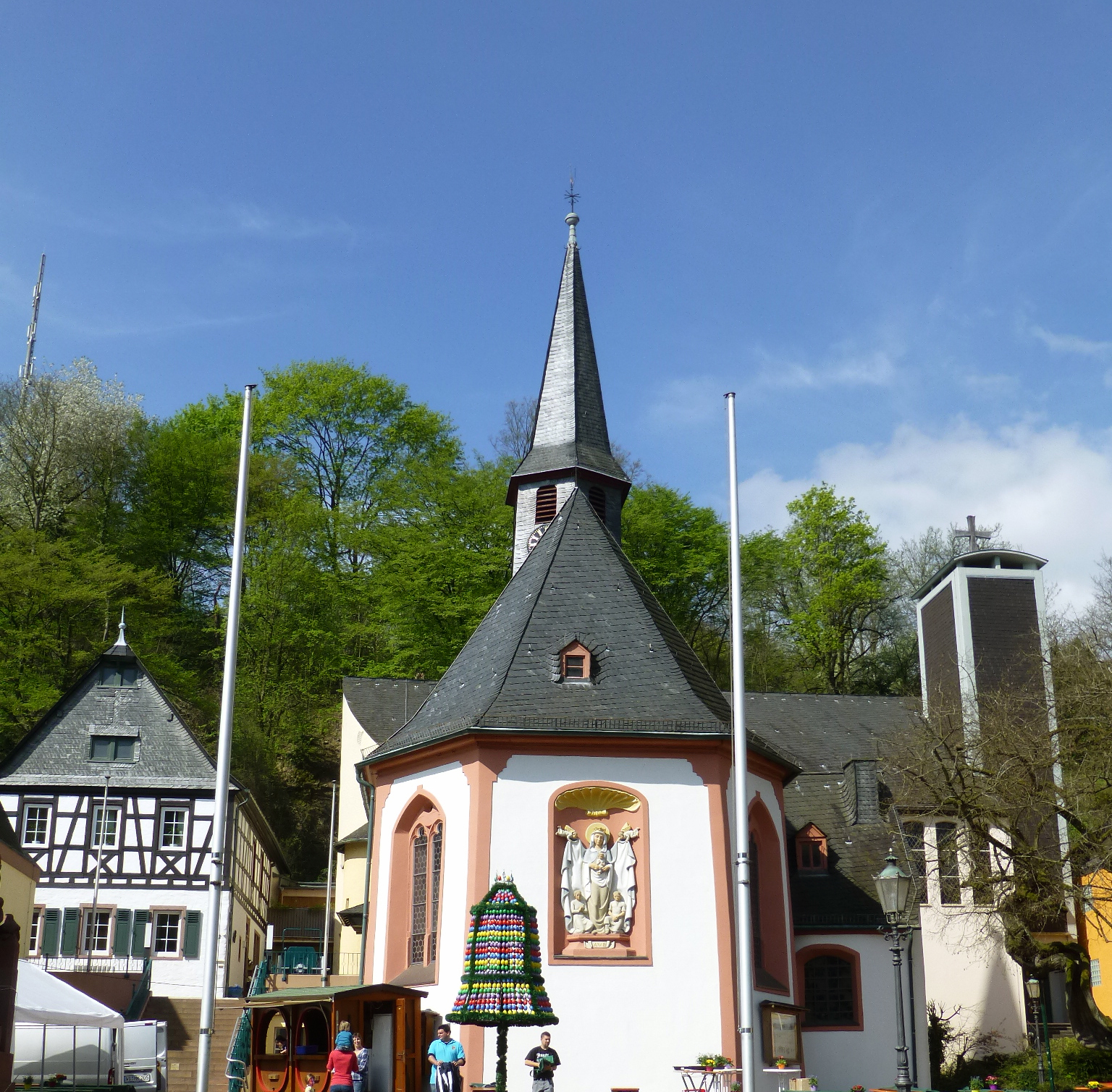
The new and old churches

The Protestant Gustav-Adolf Church was established in 1959.

== Coat of arms ==
The present coat of arms of Frauenstein was officially approved in 1951 by the Wiesbaden City Council. It was derived from two old court seals, the "Sigillu(m) Ivdicii Valis Fravwe(n)stein"(with prints dating from 1545 to 1668) and another with prints dating from 1727 to 1791. Both seals are depictions of the legendary battle of St. George and the Dragon. St. George a patron saint of the church. The color red is used to characterize Frauenstein's former position as a possession of the Archbishopric of Mainz.

Since 1928, Frauenstein has been incorporated into Wiesbaden. In municipal heraldry, complete portrayal of persons is largely avoided due to convenience and good visibility of the heraldic elements. Therefore, only parts of people are used in the heraldic shield - here, for example, the arm of St. George.

== Attractions ==
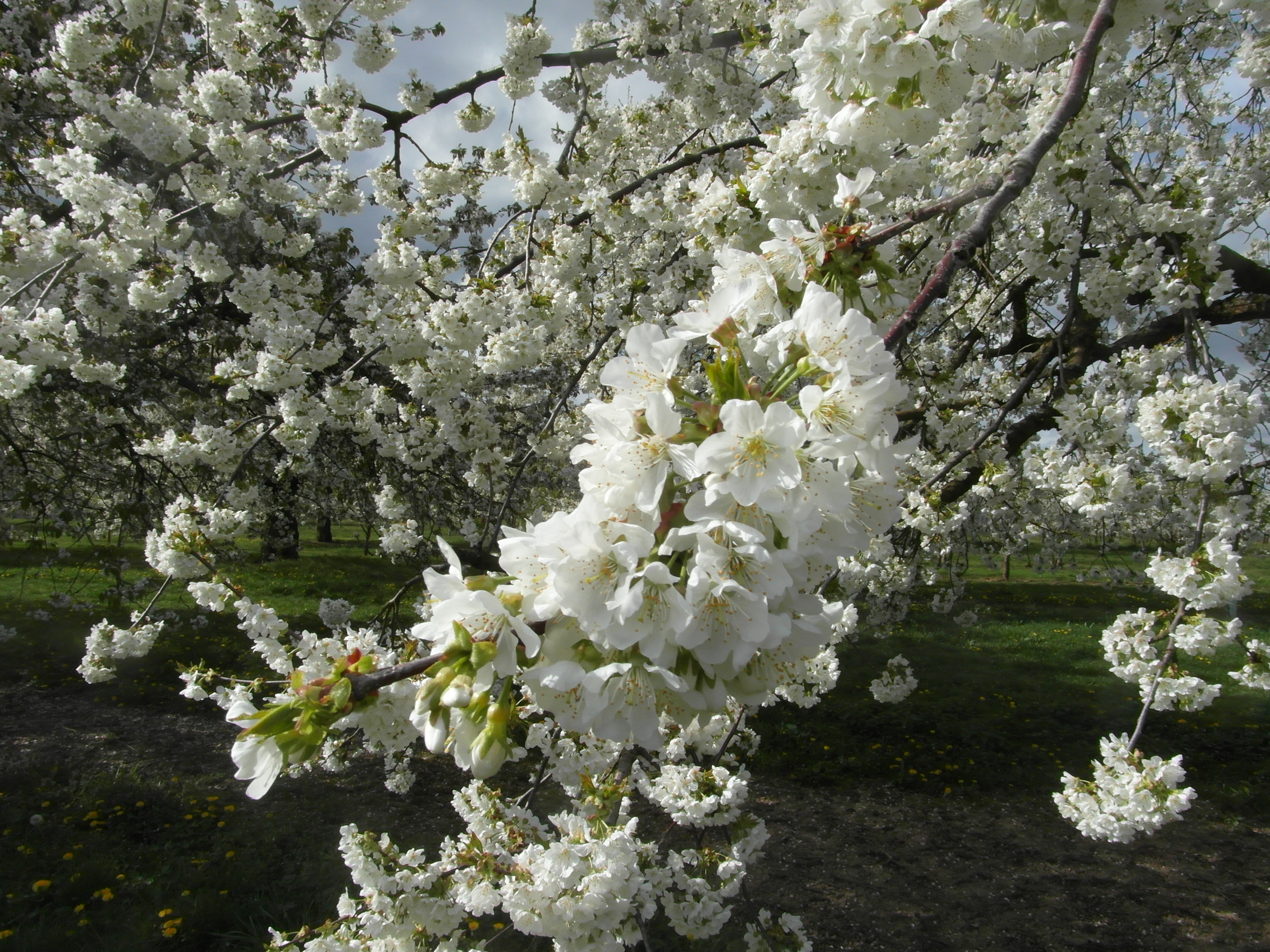
Cherry blossom, 2014

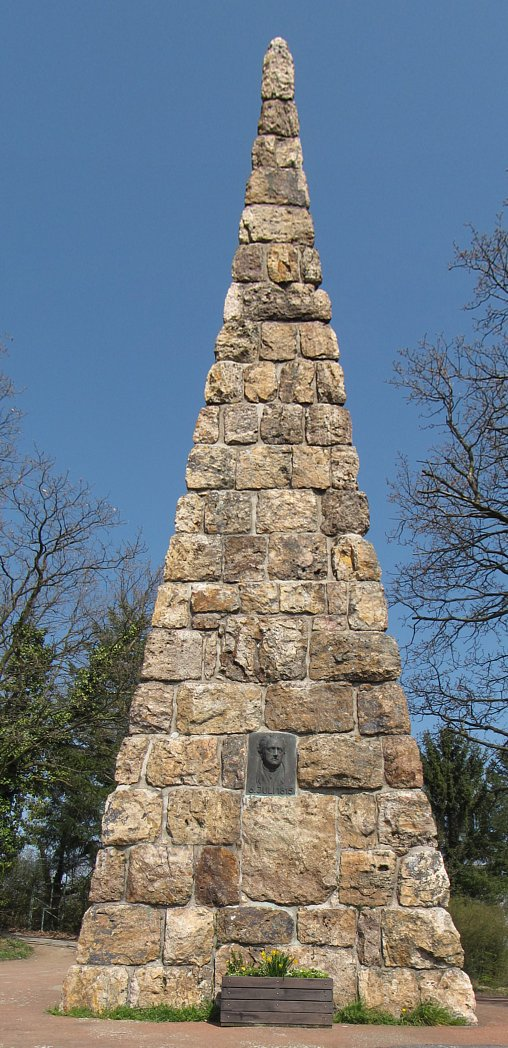
Goethestein

On a hill above the town stands the Nürnberger Hof, a former military outpost built by the Count of Nassau in the 14th century. Now owned by the city of Wiesbaden, it has been leased by the Becker family since 1939, who have operated a wine bar there since 1949. In June 1815, during a curative visit to the spas in Wiesbaden, the famous German poet and artist Johann Wolfgang von Goethe spent a lunch at the Hof admiring the "splendid view." His visit was commemorated with the Goethestein, a 13.5 m-high stone obelisk in 1932.

Other well-known estates include the Grorother Hof (established around 1327) and Hof Armada (possibly established as early as c. 1100), both south of the village center, and Schloss Sommerberg (est. 1563) to the west. North of the Grorother Court is the Europa-Weinberg ("Europe-vineyard"), in which are planted various characteristic wine-grape varieties of Europe (described by signs). A mill dating from 1699 also still stands in the southeastern portion of the Gorother Hof estate.

Another famous landmark is the "1000-year old Linden" next to the Catholic Church of St. George and St. Catherine. The fountain in the square in front of the Church is crowned with a figure of St. George. The Falkerscher Hof on Georgstraße and the Schönbornscher Hof on Kirschblütenstraße are well-preserved beautiful half-timbered houses.

The Church of St. George and St. Catherine has been a venue of the Rheingau Musik Festival, such as the ensemble amarcord.

== Politics ==
Election results for representatives to the borough assembly (Ortsbeirat) of Frauenstein are given in the following table (expressed in percent):

	Christian Democratic Union	Social Democratic Party	Free Democratic Party	Voter Turnout
2006	42.4	57.6	---	54.7
2001	42.4	57.6	---	65.2
1997	38.5	61.5	---	76.4
1993	38.6	54.8	6.6	76.1
1989	35.8	57.7	6.5	84.1
1985	42.4	54.1	3.5	84.2
1981	42.7	55.9	1.4	84.0
1977	47.1	51.4	1.5	87.7
1972	43.1	54.1	2.8	88.1

The distribution of seats in the Ortsbeirat of Frauenstein is as follows:

	CDU	SPD	Total
2006	3	4	7
2001	3	4	7
1997	3	4	7
1993	3	4	7
1989	3	4	7
1985	3	4	7
1981	3	4	7
1977	3	4	7
1972	3	4	7

== Sources ==
- Knappe, Rudolf (2000). Mittelalterliche Burgen in Hessen (Castles of the Middle Ages in Hesse).

Some material derived from German Wikipedia
