= Wiesbaden-Dotzheim =

Dotzheim
- Borough of Wiesbaden
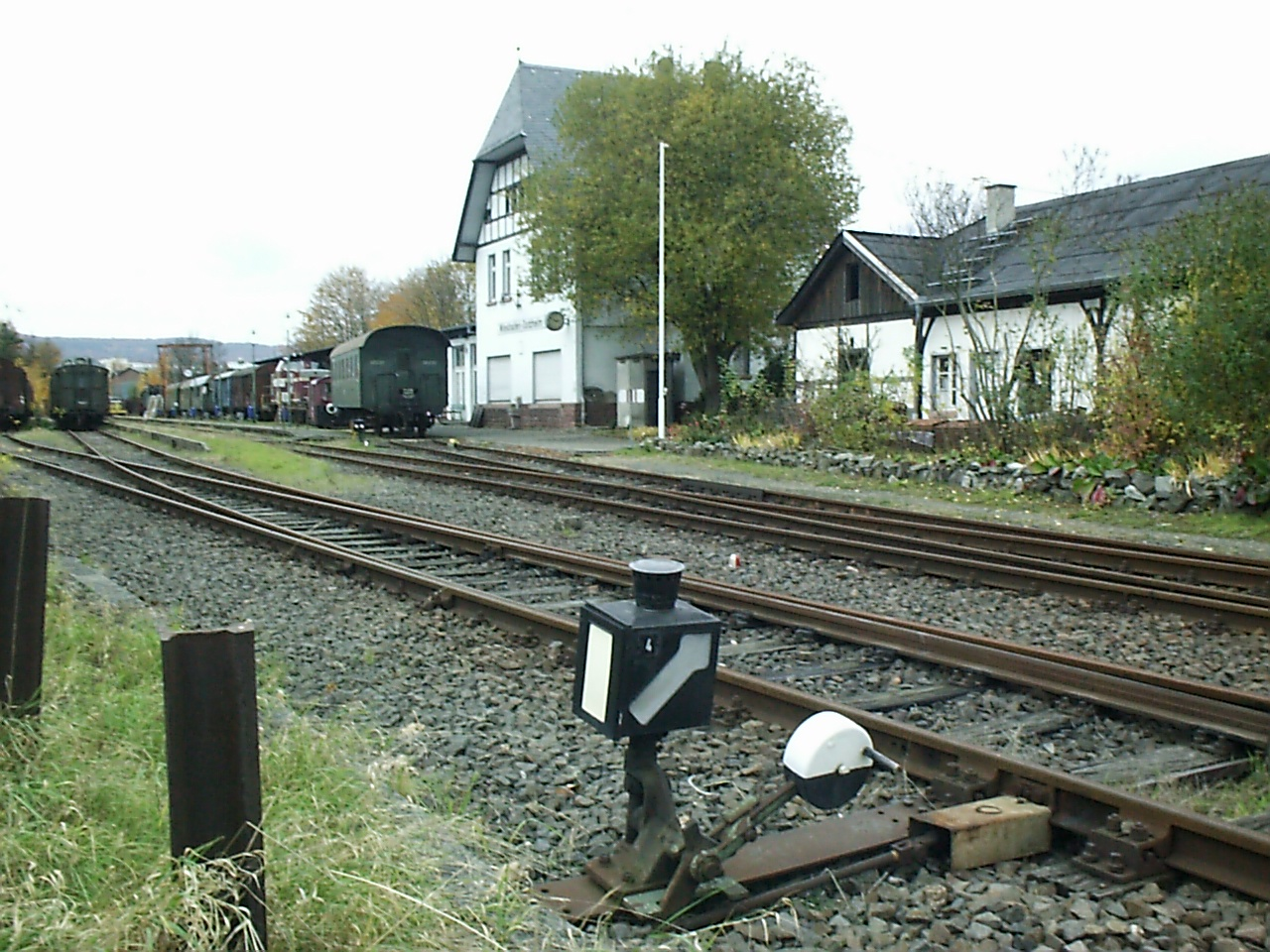
- Dotzheim station on the Aartalbahn

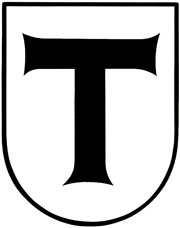
- Coat of arms

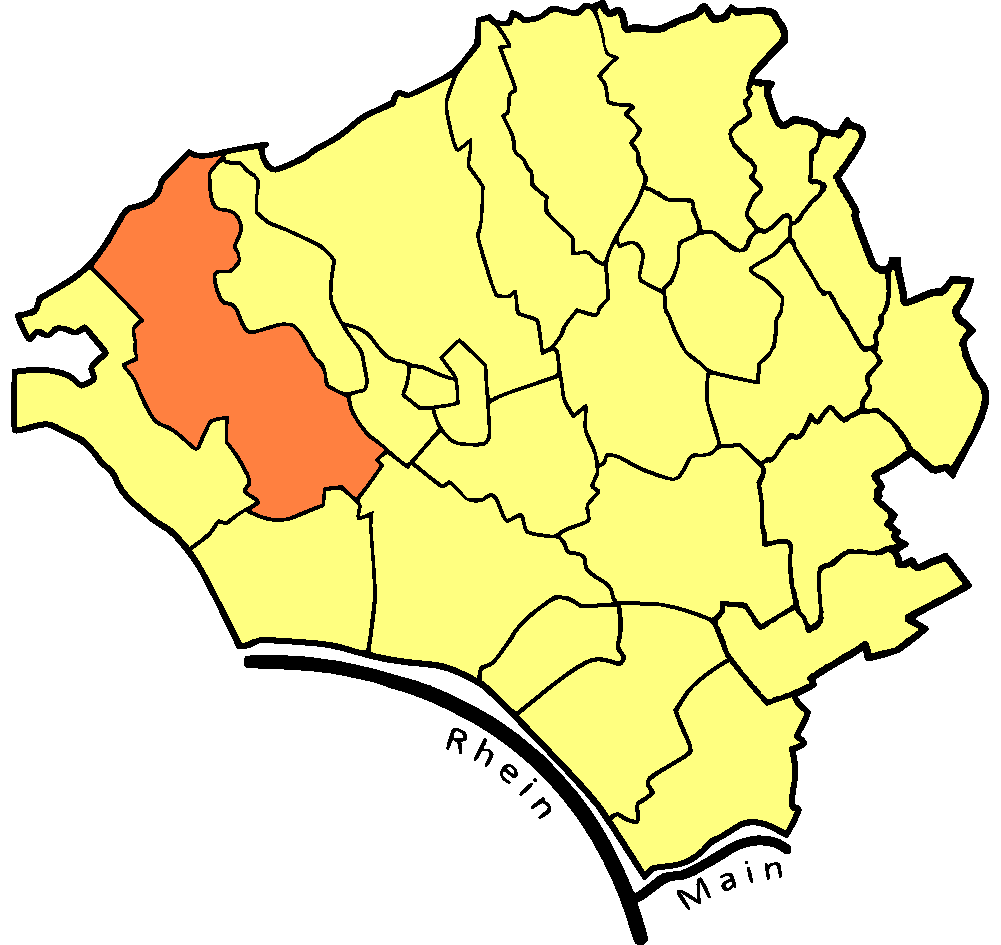
- Location of Dotzheim in Wiesbaden
- Interactive map of Dotzheim
- Location within Germany Location within Hesse
- Coordinates: 50°4′23″N 8°11′37″E
- Country: Germany
- State: Hesse
- District: Urban district
- City: Wiesbaden

Government
  - Mayor: Manfred Ernst (CDU)

Area
  - Total: 18.27 km^{2} (7.05 sq mi)

Population (2020-12-31)
  - Total: 27,557
  - Density: 1,508/km^{2} (3,907/sq mi)
- Time zone: UTC+01:00 (CET)
  - Summer (DST): UTC+02:00 (CEST)
- Postal codes: 65199, 65201
- Dialling codes: 0611
- Vehicle registration: WI
- Website: http://www.wiesbaden.de/dotzheim

Dotzheim is a western borough of Wiesbaden, capital of the state of Hesse, Germany. It is the second largest borough of the city by area and, with over 27,000 inhabitants the second-most populated of Wiesbaden's suburban boroughs. It was the largest village in the former Duchy of Nassau. The formerly independent village was incorporated into Wiesbaden in 1928.

== Geography ==
=== Location ===
Dotzheim is located in the northwest of Wiesbaden. To the north and northwest are the wooded slopes of the Hochtaunus, or High Taunus Mountains. The primary peaks along its northern boundary are Hohe Wurzel (618 m) and Schläferskopf (454 m). The Weilburger Tal (Wielburg Valley), a valley complex formed by the Wielburger Bach stream and its tributaries, leads south from the mountains. After passing through the old village center, the stream enters the more extensive Belzbachtal. The ridges that border the Belzbach valley are the Schiersteiner Hang (Schierstein Slope) on the west and the Wiesbadener Kessel on the east. As the Belzbach enters the borough of Biebrich, it becomes the Mosbach, which flows into the Rhine at Biebrich Castle.

=== Neighboring communities ===
Dotzheim is bordered on the northwest by the municipality of Taunusstein and on the other sides by other boroughs of Wiesbaden. These are Klarenthal and Rheingauviertel to the northeast, Biebrich to the southeast, Schierstein to the south, and Frauenstein to the southwest.

== History ==
=== Early history ===
The oldest evidence of settlement in the Belzbachtal comes from five closely spaced Celtic stone box graves (or cists) discovered in the area of Hohlstraße 3. The graves, made of uncut slabs of quartzite, are from the La Tène culture of the Late Iron Age - about 400 BC. There is also evidence of settlement from the Roman era. In 222, the first year of the reign of Emperor Severus Alexander, Fortunatus and Sejus dedicated an altar, a fragment of which was discovered.

After the collapse of Roman rule in the area and Frankish king Clovis I Merovingian’s later defeat of the Alamanni, Frankish settlement of the area began, especially under King Dagobert I (623 to 638). At that time, it is conjectured, a nobleman named Tuzzo or Tuozo settled in the Belzbachtal and gave his name to the place - Tuozesheim became Tozesheim and eventually Dotzheim.

The first written document which mentions Dotzheim dates to only 1128. At this time the Archbishop of Mainz, Adalbert I von Saarbrücken, gave the Mainz Cathedral the income from the possessions of the local landowners. In another document, dated 21 November 1184, Pope Lucius III (1181 to 1185) in Verona confirmed the Mainz Benedictine monastery of St. Alban’s possession of 25 churches, including that of Dotzheim. The monastery of Vögte was established in Dotzheim, to which such well-known families such as the Treasurer of Worms, the Brömser of Rüdesheim, and the Knight of Sickingen belonged. Besides the clergy of Mainz (the Mainz Cathedral, St. Alban’s, St. Clare’s, and the Karthäuser Monasteries, and St. John's Convent), the monasteries of Eberbach and Klarenthal also received income from Dotzheim. In a deed from Eberbach dated 24 June 1275 is the first mention of wine in Dotzheim - Knight Philipp von Frauenstein donated some property in Dotzheim, consisting of a mill and twelve vineyards, to the monastery.

The beginnings of the rule of the House of Nassau in and around Dotzheim are unknown. A document from 1310 testifies that Dotzheim owed Nassau taxes and services. The Lords of Eppstein had held the jurisdiction in the 13th century, but at some point control passed to the House of Nassau.

The 13th and 14th centuries mark the first mention of aristocratic families named "von Dotzheim.” The Knight Siegfried von Dotzheim (died 1316) donated to the Eberbach Abbey the first of its nine Gothic side chapels. Siegfried was buried there and his gravestone with his coat of arms (with three crowing jackdaws in the upper section) can still be seen. The nobles Sibodo (died 1331) and Catherine von Dotzheim are buried in the Klarenthal Monastery.

The village court of Dotzheim is first mentioned in writing in 1386. This can therefore be regarded as the beginning of local self-government. From 1430, there is evidence that the village was protected by fences and gates.

In 1569, Johann Lonicerus was introduced as the first Protestant minister. In 1610, about 50 percent of the houses were destroyed by a serious fire. In 1644, almost all the inhabitants of Dotzheim fled from their home during the Thirty Years' War. It took the village decades to recover from the consequences of the war.

The Protestant parsonage opposite the village church was built in 1695, followed by a schoolhouse in 1698. The new building of the parish church dates from 1716 to 1718.

=== Modern era ===
The population increased significantly in the 18th century as many construction workers, involved in the development of the “spa city” of Wiesbaden, settled in Dotzheim. In 1889, Dotzheim was connected to the Langenschwalbacher railway (later called the Aartalbahn) and a thriving industrial and commercial area grew up around the station. German Federal Railways (Deutsche Bundesbahn) discontinued service on this line in 1983, but the line still exists and the Nassau Touristic Railway operates a museum train on it.

At the turn of the 20th century, under the administrations of the last three Bürgermeister (mayors) of Dotzheim, namely Georg Heil (1881 to 1901), August Rossel (1901 to 1913) and Eduard Spork Horst (1913 to 1928), the village got a new town hall, three schools, and a forest cemetery. A development plan was implemented, which even put valuable agricultural parts of the village under protection. By 1906 Dotzheim was connected to the local gas, water and electricity supply network. A streetcar line between Wiesbaden and Dotzheim was also established. The post office at the upper Wiesbadener Straße was built in 1901 (it closed in 1997).

Shortly before the outbreak of World War I, Dotzheim had about 6,200 residents and proudly described itself as "the largest village in the lands of Nassau. In 1928 the independent village was incorporated into Wiesbaden.

The re-armament efforts in the era of National Socialism brought extensive barracks buildings in Kohlheck and Freudenberg. Dotzheim survived World War II virtually unscathed. A deep, wide crater in the northwestern Weilburg valley does testify to an attempted bombing raid. After the war, American occupation forces took up residence in the barracks.

After the Second World War, the need for housing a large number of refugees and displaced persons, and Wiesbaden’s emergence as the state capital of Hesse, led to extensive development of Dotzheim. The neighborhoods of Freudenberg and Märchenland had already been started in the 1930s. Now a number of new residential developments were built around the borough, including Kohlheck, Schelmengraben, and Sauerland. Schelmengraben, a development of 2,500 homes for 7,000 people, was the conception of urban planner Professor May. After the withdrawal of some of the American military forces from the area, the more recent development of "Auf der Heide" has emerged from the redevelopment of the barracks area in front of Freudenberg Castle.

== Coat of arms ==
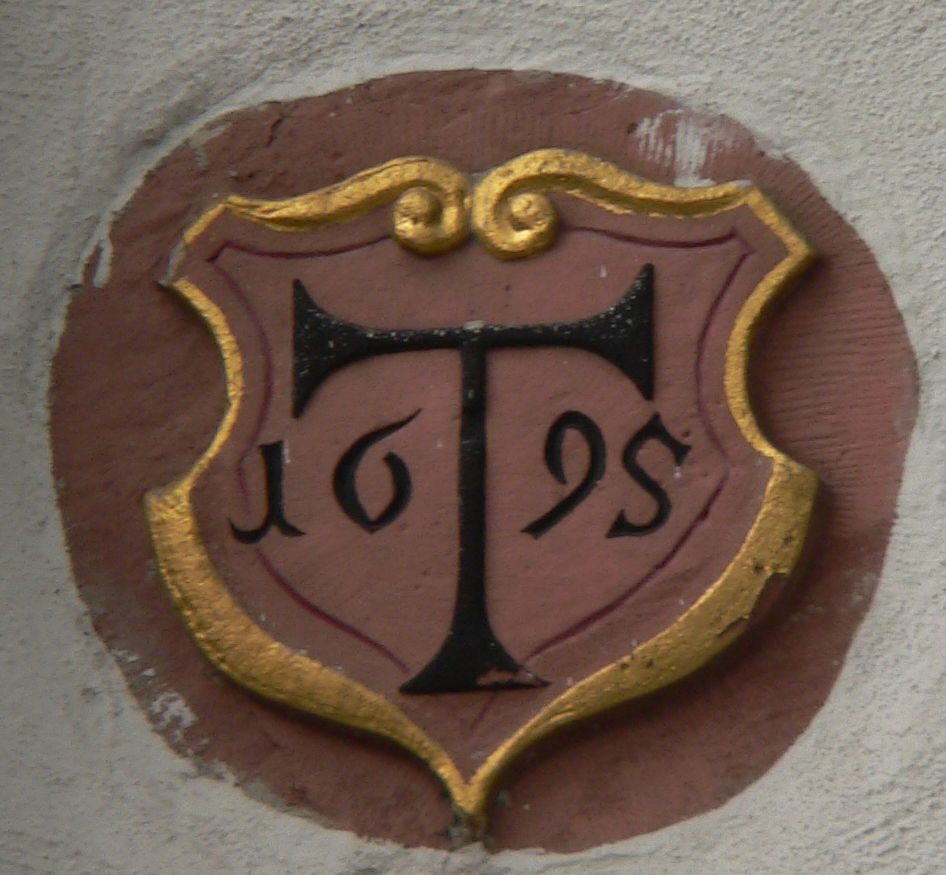
St. Anthony's Cross, displayed here on the former Antonine hospital in Frankfurt-Höchst, is one possible source of the Dotzheim coat of arms

The coat of arms of Dotzheim consists simply of a black Latin letter “T.” This coat of arms was officially adopted in 1951 and approved by the City of Wiesbaden. The same coat of arms has appeared on all of the historic seals of the town. The oldest seal, with prints dating from 1551 and 1585, was adopted as the Counts of Nassau enforced their national sovereignty in the 16th century. The meaning of the T is not known. Various theories are that it may represent the first letter of the name of the founder of the town, the original initial of the village itself, or the Cross of St. Anthony.

== Culture ==
Dotzheim has a varied cultural scene that helps to preserve its independence and identity despite decades of involvement in the larger entity of Wiesbaden. Annual events include "Dotzheimer Days", the Kohlheck Veranstaltungsprogramm, and the Dibbemarkt which takes place annually in September on the central Pfarrer-Luja-Platz. The Aartalbahn is a museum train which operates between the Dotzheim station (bahnhof) and Hohenstein Castle (Nassauische Touristikbahn e.V.). Other attractions are the rediscovered ancient Dotzheimer wine Judenkirsch, the attractive Heimat (Heritage) Museum, and the Castle Freudenberg with its exhibition "experience for the senses" and the adjacent "smallest museum in the world" – a piece of cake with peepholes. There are also celebrations in the Freudenberg, Sauerland und Schelmengraben neighborhoods, and the Wine Festival in the local wine estates.

=== Schloss Freudenberg ===
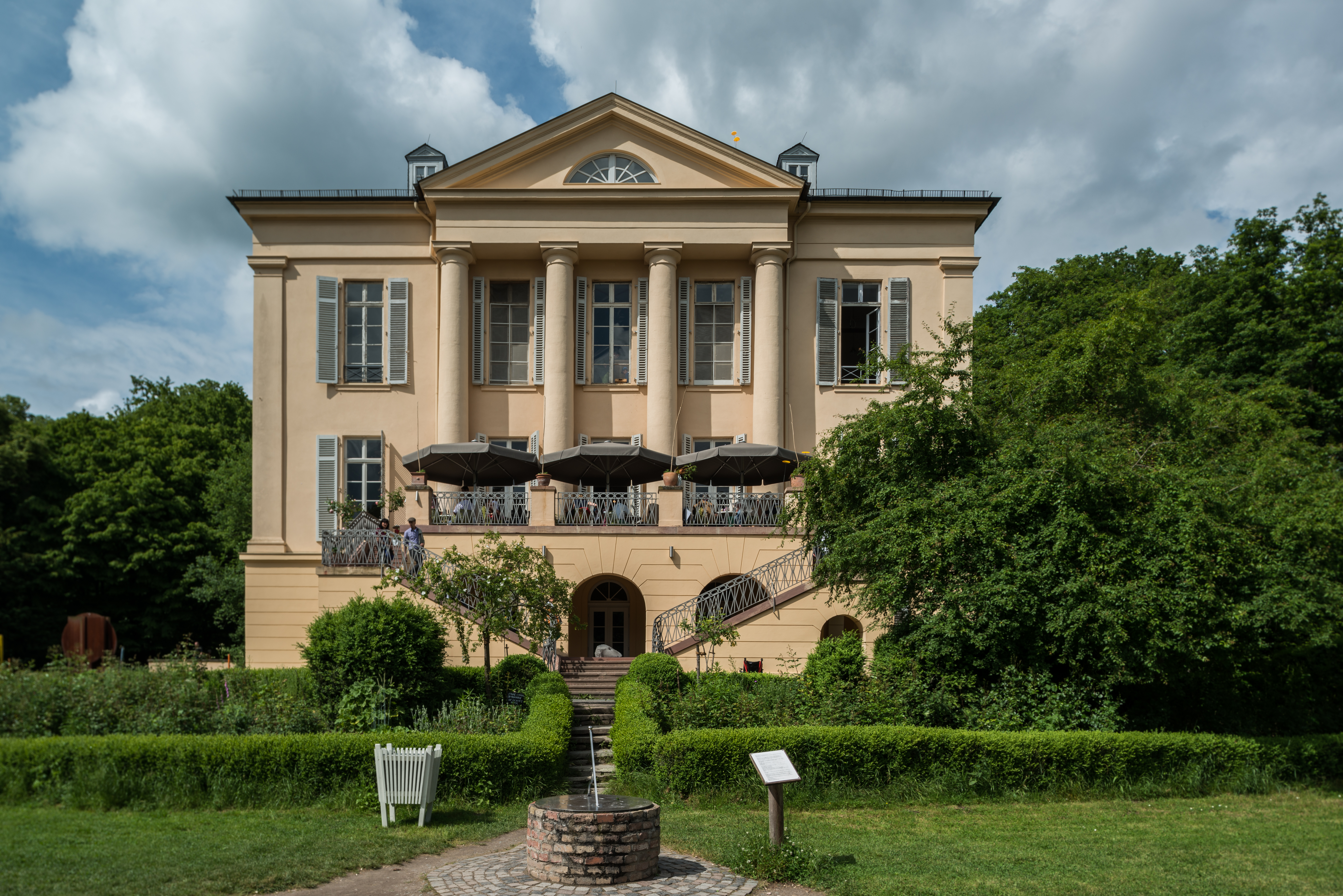
Schloss Freudenberg in the midst of its park

Schloss Freudenberg in Dotzheim was built in 1904 by Paul Schultze-Naumburg as a palace in a park. His clients were Scottish painter James Pitcairn-Knowles and Marie-Eugénie-Guérinet Victoria (1870–1959). The couple lived in the castle for only three years.

Around 1920, the Landkreis Essen operated a children's home there, which subsequently was taken over by the city of Essen. The operation lasted until 1931. During the time of National Socialism, Schloß Freudenberg became, first, the Taunusblick Children's Home and then a mothers' home for Lebensborn.

After 1945, until the 1970s, the United States Army operated a casino in the castle for officers stationed at the nearby barracks of Camp Pieri. It was later used by the International Pentecostal Church of Wiesbaden. In 1973, the U.S. Army gave the castle over to the German Bundesvermögensverwaltung (federal asset management). Abandoned in 1983, the building eventually fell into an extreme state of disrepair.

In 1993, the Nature and Art Society, a charitable initiative of Matthias Schenk and Beatrice Dastis Schenk, took over the castle and park and began a restoration of the building. The Schenks were students of Hugo Kükelhaus (1900–1984), who developed the idea of field experience to develop the senses and the mind. From 1975 until his death in 1984, Kükelhaus toured Germany with a caravan of circus tents and “experience stations.” The Schenks then continued touring, until choosing Schloss Freudenberg as the permanent home of the Experience Field.

At the beginning of the renovation in 1994, Emil Hädler, a professor at Fachhochschule Mainz and an expert in building maintenance, formulated the motto “Renovation = Healing through Art.” This principle, the curative effect of art, has become a model for other projects. Another guiding principle is allowing use and redevelopment to run continuously in parallel, turning the renovation into a space with its own kind of experience—a constantly changing temporary opening of new possibilities of perception. The redevelopment project is expected to last until 2030.

In addition to the ideas of Kükelhaus, the artistic renovation also applies the ideas of anthroposophy, founded by Rudolf Steiner (1861–1925) and those of social sculpture, founded by Joseph Beuys (1921–1986). Numerous events about these concepts take place at the castle.

With support from the city of Wiesbaden, the Nature and Art Society maintains a unique cultural center at the castle and its surrounding 16 hectare grounds. The focal point is the so-called “experience for the senses”, which with over 80 interactive experience stations, with instruments and tests according to the models of Kükelhaus.

Schloss Freudenberg's cafe offers refreshments and desserts made at Mechtildshausen's bakery, a local organic and communal farm. “Der Dunkelbar” (“The Dark Bar”) serves food and drink in complete darkness.

=== The Straßenmühle ===
The Straßenmühle was built in 1714, two years before the construction of the present Protestant church. The mill was located on the "Elfelder Weg", today's Straßenmühlweg. In medieval times, this road connected Wiesbaden with the Rheingau, via on Freudenberg, the guest house "Zur Heide," and Oberwalluf (Rennpfad). The historic structure now operates as a guest house and restaurant.

The original deed was issued to Franz Klein of Bingen by Count Friederich Ludwig of Nassau Saarbrücken and Saar, Lord of Lahr, Wiesbaden, and Idstein. The mill went through numerous owners over the years. Between 1860 and 1889 alone, it went through nine sales. It particularly suffered during the War of 1795. The owners began operating a restaurant at the mill in 1890. It soon became a popular locale. As a mill, the Straßenmühle ceased operations in 1927. The small mill could not compete with the larger mills as farmers began selling their grain to cooperatives and small customers could not run the operation.

A millstone from the mill was found by chance. Made of sandstone, the “runner” measures 94 cm in diameter and 24 cm in thickness and now stands in the establishment's garden. The original "overshot" mill wheel measured 6 m in diameter and approximately 0.6 m in thickness. It was powered by water from a millrace, which diverged from the Belzbach in the center of Dotzheim. It was about 1.1 km long and 80 cm wide.

== Religious life ==
=== Roman Catholic community ===
The first written mention of the Dotzheimer church comes from the year 1128. In 1569, the country's Lord, Count Philipp von Nassau-Idstein, introduced the first Protestant pastor to Dotzheim. Catholics from Dotzheim, whose existence has been documented since 1696, could only worship in Frauenstein.

As the number of Catholics in Dotzheim increasingly grew at the end of the 19th century, money was collected to build a Catholic church. On 8 December 1901, the Mass was offered again in Dotzheim for the first time since the Protestant Reformation. The service was conducted in the old school, because the church was not ready. On 31 March 1902 (Easter Monday), the church was solemnly inaugurated and dedicated to Saint Joseph. Dotzheim was not its own parish, but organizationally belonged to Frauenstein until 1926.

During World War II, on the night of 2–3 February 1945, St. Joseph's Church was burned during a bombing raid. It was only roughly restored afterward. In 1955, the church was expanded and a large tower added, but by the 1970s, the church was again too small. It was demolished in 1976, and the church and rectory were replaced with a modern community center, with the church on one side and the rectory and parish office on the other. Bishop Gerhard Pieschl inaugurated the facility on 3 February 1978.

The structure of St. Joseph's Church is impressive with massive, geometric shapes such as rectangles, triangles, and cylinders, covered with a pyramidal roof. The exterior and the interior of the church are covered with a rustic plaster, the "trademark" of the architect Justus Dahinden. Built in the style of the 1970s, when churches were understood as multi-functional rooms, the Church of St. Joseph still has a strong religious character. It has windows of completely transparent glass, an ox-blood red color on the inside, indirect lighting, and pale wood. The Easter candlesticks and a Cross with Christ Enthroned in a mandorla (wood) were designed by the Wiesbaden artist Clemens Schmidt. The organ in St. Joseph's, built in the French style by the organ workshop of Alfred Wild in Saverne, Alsace, France, has 20 registers including “Spanish Trumpets.” The construction of the organ, inaugurated on 19 March 1994, was completed in 2003. The St. Joseph Parish Center next to the church includes a kindergarten, cafeteria, meeting rooms and a bowling alley.

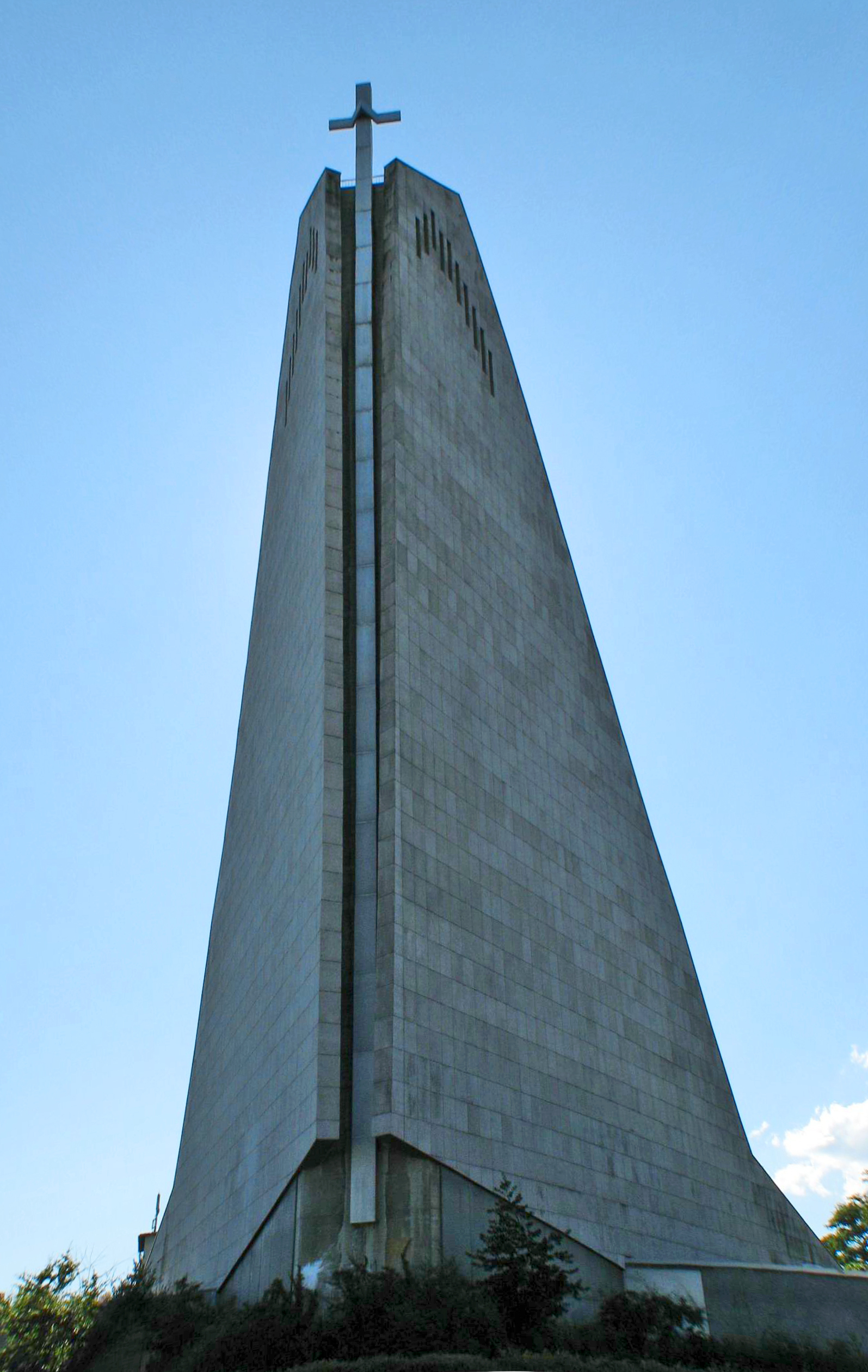
Mariä Heimsuchung in Kohlheck

The Mariä Heimsuchung, dedicated to the Visitation, in Kohlheck was built between 1963 and 1966 and soon became a Wiesbaden landmark. Designed by the architect Johannes Jackel of Berlin, the building is meant to be a symbol of the path of God with people, as shown in the example of the Virgin Mary. It forms the shape of a giant letter “M” (for Mary) when viewed from the west. Its ground plan is shaped like a Star of David, because Mary was of the Jewish people. The dominant construction materials of the church are concrete, Rhenish slate, and glass. One of the largest stained-glass church windows in the world allows the altar area to be flooded with light and the narrow east wall to be illuminated with reflected light.

=== Protestant churches ===
There are five Protestant (Evangelische) churches in Dotzheim. These are the central village church on the Roemergasse, the Dreikoenigsgemeinde (Three Kings Community) in Freudenberg, the Paul-Gerhardt-Kirche in Kohlheck (named for famous German Lutheran hymn writer, Paul Gerhardt), the Erlösergemeinde (Deliverer Community) in Sauerland, and the community church of Schelmengraben.

Dotzheim is also home to the Freie Christengemeinde (Free Christian Community) Wiesbaden. This Pentecostal church, whose roots in Wiesbaden go back to 1932, has been located in Dotzheim since June 2001.

== Politics ==
The distribution of seats in borough council (Ortsbeirat) of Dotzheim since 1972 is as follows:

	CDU	SPD	Alliance '90/The Greens	FDP	The Republicans	Total
2006	6	5	2	1	1	15
2001	6	5	1	2	1	15
1997	6	6	1	0	2	15
1993	6	6	2	1	0	15
1989	5	8	1	1	0	15
1985	7	7	1	0	0	15
1981	8	6	0	1	0	15
1977	8	7	0	0	0	15
1972	6	8	0	1	0	15

== Sports ==
The oldest and largest athletic club in Dotzheim is the TuS Wiesbaden-Dotzheim 1848 eV. It has organized activities in association football, badminton, team handball, Radball (cycle polo), judo and Ju-Jitsu, table tennis, chess, and sports for seniors and the disabled. With 2400 members and employing more than 40 licensed trainers, Wiesbaden-TuS Dotzheimer is one of the largest clubs in Wiesbaden.

The "Turnverein Dotzheim" (Dotzheim gymnastics club) was founded in the Revolution year of 1848. In 1875, the club built its first Turnhalle (gymnasium) on Frauensteiner Strasse. The construction and dedication of the Turnerheim took place in 1895. In 1914, the gymnasium was taken for war purposes and in 1921 the Turnerheim was seized by the French occupation forces. In 1925, a new Notturnhalle was constructed on Erich Ollenhauer-Str. as a training facility for gymnastics, fistball, and handball. From 1939 through 1945, almost the entire membership was involved in active military service, leading to a total collapse of the club until after the war.

After World War II, the Allied forces ordered that boroughs with less than 10,000 residents must have only one sports club. For this reason, in December 1945, the TuS Wiesbaden-Dotzheim 1848 eV was organized as the legal successor of the former clubs: Turnverein 1848 eV, Radlerclub 1902 eV (cycling club), Kraftsportverein 1903, Arbeiterturnverein 1908 (workers’ gymnastics club), and the Verein der Sportfreunde 1910 eV (association of sports enthusiasts).

An independent association football club had existed in Dotzheim since 1910. Today the football department, with over 300 members, is one of the largest divisions of the TuS Wiesbaden-Dotzheim. For the 2008/2009 season, the men's teams compete in the Kreisoberliga and Kreisliga C. Including the youth leagues, TuS Wiesbaden-Dotzheim has a total of 10 football teams. In addition, an "old men’s” team is active in a number of games and contests throughout the year. The top men's and women's handball teams compete in the Hessian Landesliga Mitte.

Another club, 1. SC Kohlheck 1951 e.V., is based in the Kohlheck neighborhood. It offers competition in football, volleyball, fist ball, tennis, gymnastics, table tennis, and Bob and Luge.

Dotzheim is also the home of Basketball Club Wiesbaden 1952 eV, whose top basketball teams compete in the Hessian men's Landesliga and women's Oberliga. Other football clubs include Kohlheck United 1998 and FC Freudenberg 1950.eV. Finally, Dotzheim is home to the swimming club, Schwimmverein Delphin Wiesbaden 1986 e.V.

== Famous residents ==
- Johanna Leinen, German television actress
