= Schloss Freudenberg =

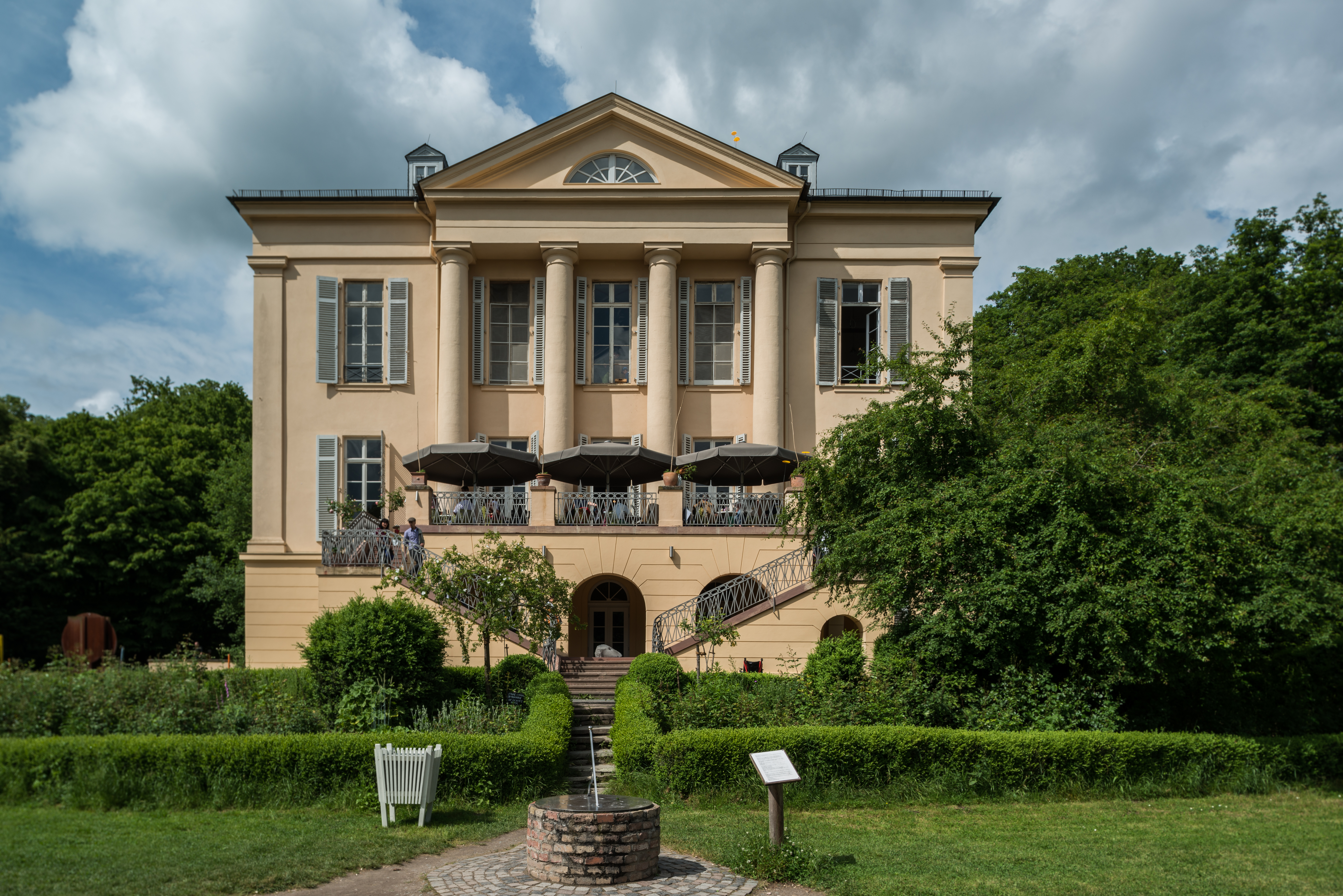
- View from the park
- Interactive map of the Schloss Freudenberg area

General information
- Status: Educational facility
- Location: Wiesbaden-Dotzheim, Hesse, Germany
- Coordinates: 50°03′58″N 08°10′51″E
- Construction started: 1904

Design and construction
- Architect: Paul Schultze-Naumburg

Schloss Freudenberg is a large villa in Wiesbaden, the capital of Hesse, Germany. It was built as a private residence in Dotzheim, and completed in 1904. The house and the large garden have been open to the public as an educational facility from 1993. Its exhibitions inside the building and outside in the park are devoted to the experience of sensory perception.

== History ==
Schloss Freudenberg was built in 1904/05 on designs by architect Paul Schultze-Naumburg in a park, on a commission by the painter James Pitcairn-Knowles and Marie Eugénie Victoire Guérinet (1870–1959). The couple lived there until 1908. After World War I, the residence was made a casino of the French army, and then a summer location of the Palast Hotel in Wiesbaden.

Around 1920, the Landkreis Essen started running a home for children, Kinderheim Taunusblick, in Schloss Freudenberg, which was later run by Essen, and closed in 1931. From 1933, the building served as the headquarter of the Frauenschaft Essen (Women's Association of Essen) as a Mütterheim (Mothers' Home), an institution of the Lebensborn. The place was sold to the Heeresstandortverwaltung (Garrison Administration) Wiesbaden in 1939. After World War II, the U.S. army ran an officers' mess there for the Camp Pieri barracks nearby. The U.S. army transferred the run-down property to the Institute for Federal Real Estate in 1973. It was used by the United Pentecostal Church as a seminary for pastors with a library, a tea room and a church room from 1977 to 1984. It then was abandoned and remained empty and in disrepair, due to destruction, vandalism and fire.

In 1993, the Gesellschaft Natur & Kunst (Association for Nature and Art), an initiative of Matthias Schenk and Beatrice Dastis Schenk, with a group of artists, craftsmen and pedagogues, restored the building and the park. Following the motto Sanierung = Heilung durch Kunst und Kultur (Renovation = Healing through art and culture), they created the first Erfahrungsfeld zur Entfaltung der Sinne (Zone of experiences for the development of the senses) to foster the experience of the senses and of thought.

== Restoration and exhibition ==
At the beginning of the restoration in 1994, Emil Hädler, professor at the Fachhochschule Mainz (Mainz University of Applied Sciences) and an expert for the restoration of historic buildings (Altbauinstandhaltung), coined the motto "Sanierung = Heilung durch Kunst" (Restoration = Healing through Art). While traditionally all use of a structure is interrupted during restoration, the Schloss Freudenberg would be restored in several phases so that there would always be some areas in use. Hädler thought that the resulting provisional itineraries would create opportunities for novel sensory experiences. The concept became a model for other buildings and parks in Europe and the world.

The development of artistic activities is based on the Erfahrungsfeld zur Entfaltung der Sinne (Zone of experiences for the development of the senses) by Hugo Kükelhaus, of 160 stations, instruments and experiments. This permanent exhibition has been named a Gesamtkunstwerk by the founders, in the sense of the Soziale Plastik by Joseph Beuys. It is financed by entry fees, seminars and cultural events. The exhibition is devoted to sensory experiences, such as a Botanical Theatre based on the painting of that name by Paul Klee, a Windharfe, Goethe's Theory of Colours (Farbenlehre), and a Tastgalerie with objects to touch without seeing them. It includes the building and the park.

The project is run by around 80 women and men of 15 nationalities who take care of the building and the park, organise a shop, seminars, vacation programs, a cafe and a Dunkelbar, an unlit bar in which visitors experience what it feels like to be blind.
