= James Pitcairn-Knowles =

German painter

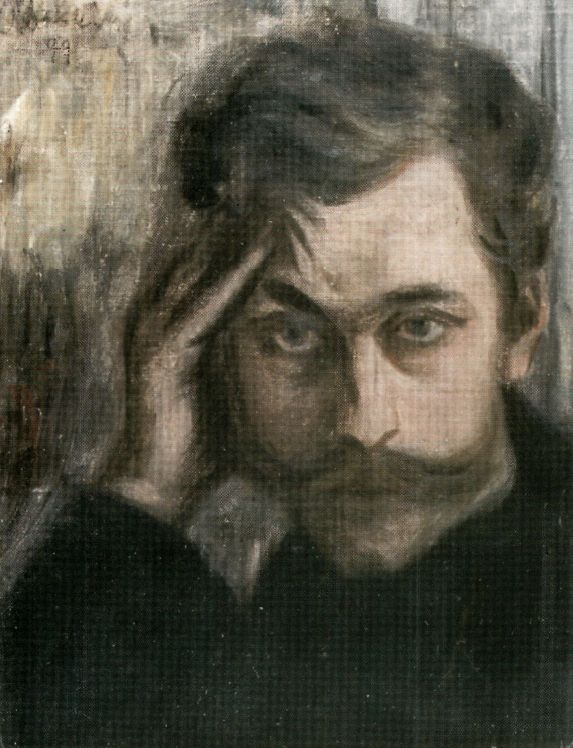
James Pitcairn Knowles by József Rippl-Rónai, 1899

James Pitcairn-Knowles (28 September 1863 - 2 January 1954) was a painter, graphic artist, and sculptor of Scottish descent who spent most of his life in Germany. Because he went to school in Wiesbaden, exhibited his pictures in the spa town and had the Schloss Freudenberg built on the edge of it, he is counted among the Wiesbaden painters.

== Early life ==
William Knowles, the father of James, had originally come from Aberdeen and the surrounding area in the northeast of Scotland, but had become rich by trading in wool, grain and dry goods in Rotterdam. In 1862, after the death of his first wife, he married the opera singer Doris Kluge, a Jew whose parents owned a clothing store in Berlin. Knowles and his two siblings, his sister Isabella—who died at the age of fifteen in 1865, and his brother Andrew Pitcairn-Knowles, were born in Rotterdam, where the family was registered with the British Embassy. The business in Rotterdam was so successful for William that in 1873, at the age of fifty-two, he retired from business and moved to the spa town of Wiesbaden where he was able to concentrate on his passion, his art collection, primarily Old Masters.

James Knowles had gone to the private Küngler Institute in Wiesbaden-Biebrich, but at the age of 18 his father sent him to Manchester to gain experience in the textile industry in order to eventually be able to aid his older stepbrother, William junior, in the family business in Rotterdam. But this attempt to introduce Knowles into the wool trade failed. He returned to Wiesbaden in 1882 and was able to persuade his father to finance him to study art instead.

== Education ==
From 1883 Knowles studied at the Academy of Fine Arts in Munich with Carl Theodor von Piloty and Fritz von Uhde. He then went to the Weimar Art School to enroll with Leopold von Kalckreuth. All three teachers helped shape Knowles's realistic painting style, which he practised until the 1950s.

== In Paris ==
In 1887, Knowles went to Paris to study at the Académie Julian in the studio of Jean-Paul Laurens. Having completed his training in Munich and Weimar, Knowles saw Laurens as the "right teacher [...], who keeps to the middle ground between the costume painting of the older school and the romanticism that has again flourished today with a move into medieval mysticism." Works by Besnard, Burne-Jones, Crane, and Dante Gabriel Rossetti are said to have initially fascinated him.

In Paris he met other artists, like the Hungarian painter Mihály Munkácsy and the Viennese art dealer Charles Sedelmeyer, [6] from whom William Knowles had acquired paintings. [7] At a reception he met József Rippl-Rónai, who later became the most famous Hungarian painter of Classical Modernism. [8] Knowles was to have a deep, lifelong friendship with him, as evidenced by five portraits that Rónai painted of his friend. [9]

Around 1888 Knowles and Ronai came into contact with the Nabis and were both accepted into their community. The Scot and the Hungarian, along with Morgens Ballin, Félix Vallotton and Jan Verkade, were among the few non-French in the group. Some of Knowles's works, such as the woodcut “Le Bain”, document a clear, albeit temporary, influence of the Nabis on his art. [10] The art historian and writer Mela Escherich in 1912 wrote about Knowles's innovations in art: “The actual school influences are not recognisable. More important were the rich spiritual relationships that opened up to the young artist, especially in Paris." Seem [11] This also included being associated with Aristide Maillol, whom he also introduced to his friend Ronai in 1890. [12]

In Paris, Knowles met Marie-Eugénie-Guérinet Victoria (1870-1959), an illegitimate daughter of Napoleon III and a lady-in-waiting to Empress Eugénie. Knowles, Ronai and Lazarine Baudrion, Ronai's girlfriend and later wife, knew Marie-Eugénie only under the name Yvonne. Disappointed with her marriage to a much older man, a duke, Yvonne had left him and intended to become a nun. At the same time, Knowles, who was prone to manic depression, had decided to become a monk. When they met, both gave up their plans and instead moved to Wiesbaden. [13]

== Back in Wiesbaden ==
Although he returned home to Wiesbaden in 1891 with great plans, he contacted typhus, which drained his strength [14] and prevented him from painting for three years. In January 1895 he, together with August von Heyden and Hubert von Heyden, exhibited in the Fritz Gurlitt Salon. Rippl-Ronai had been commissioned by the Hungarian Count Tivandar Andrássy [15] to design the dining room for his castle Tiszadob. In 1897/98 Ronai designed coloured windows and a glass ceiling "with the participation of my friend Knowles in Wiesbaden", [16] where both were produced under the supervision of the artists.[17]

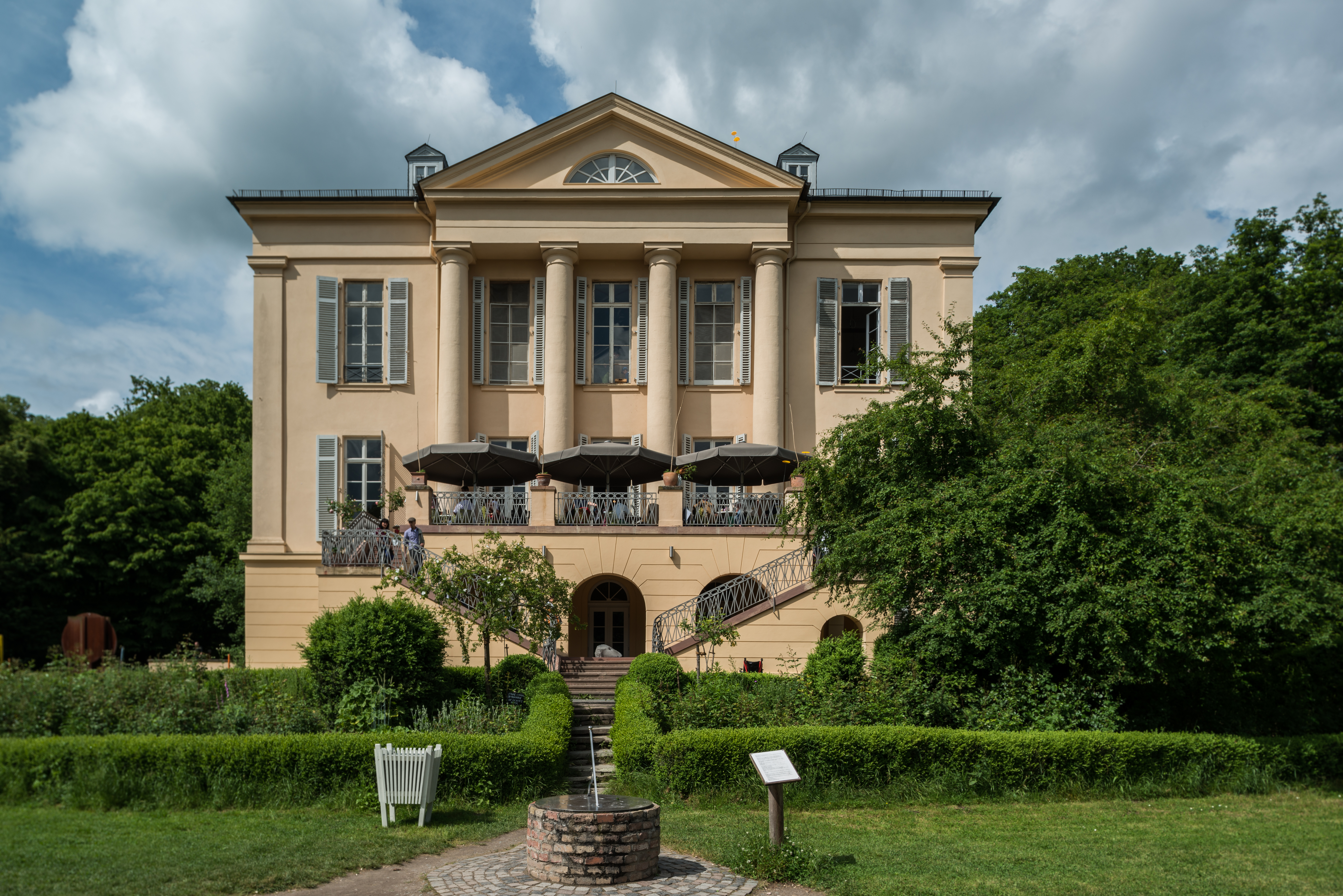
Schloss Freudenberg

Ronai's former home in his hometown of Kapsovar, in Hungary, had been redesigned as the Rippl-Ronai Museum. As Rónai returned to Hungary, he took along a number of paintings by Knowles as gifts to the museum. A number of Knowles' works are located there today. During this time Knowles devised ideas for an earthly paradise. [18] In 1902, he led negotiations for the purchase of a site on a hill overlooking the Rhine in Wiesbaden-Dotzheim. In 1903 a solid log house was built there by Swedish carpenters. Knowles and Yvonne / Marie-Eugénie-Guérinet Victoria commissioned the architect Paul Schultze-Naumburg to design their palace. In the fall of 1905 it was ready for occupancy and was named Schloss Freudenberg (Joy Mountain Castle). There the couple held lavish parties and balls, which the local newspapers several times reported on as in, for example, a 1906 article: "With fairy-like lighting [...] a frugal supper took place in the evening, with toasts being made to the gracious hosts, Mr. J. Pitcairn-Knowles and his esteemed wife." [19] When Knowles and Marie-Eugénie-Guérinet Victoria separated in 1909, the castle was sold. In total, around 660,000 marks were likely spent on the site, buildings and park (without a water supply). [20]

In 1912 the Wiesbaden Gallery Aktuaryus presented Knowles in an exhibition which the magazine Der Cicerone enthusiastically described. "The artist has settled for some time in Wiesbaden, where he has quickly reached the highest rank. Pitcair-Knowles is a painter of women. His art breathes high culture, sensitive taste, spiritualistic empathy for the secret realm of the feminine. A technique of the most subtle kind. Fine, grey tones blend to the milky, sometimes increase slightly to the hue of yellowish or brownish marble or strive towards a breath-taking pink, subdued to the last degree of perceptibility. " [21]

As a British national, Knowles had been interned for some time during the First World War. [22]

== Portrait orders ==
In 1919, Knowles married the thirty-three-year-old Princess Louise zu Solms-Braunfels (1885–1964). The couple spent the following years in the Solms villa in Bad Homburg. This was followed by stays in the Solms castles in Lich and Braunfels. Knowles spent the last decades with his wife in Hungen Castle in the Gießen district. Relatives and members of the Hessian nobility invited Knowles to their castles and let him portray them. From a letter to his friend Rippl-Ronai in Kaposvár one learns that Knowles continued to be a valued portraitist in Wiesbaden. For example, Knowles painted the wife of ophthalmologist Hermann Pagenstecher (1844–1932) so that he could present the portrait to his visitors. In another letter to Ronai, Knowles reported that in the late 1920s he earned 6-10,000 Reichsmarks on a portrait.

== In the 1930s ==
In the 1930s, according to the art historian Schenck zu Schweinsberg [23], “ Knowles distinguished himself with excellent observation, a concise, controlled, sharply modulated painting style limited to the representation of heads that were often overlapped by the frame. The sparse backgrounds dispense with any hint of pictorial space. [...] To give this highly educated painter a fixed position within German painting does not seem possible at the moment. " [24] Accordingly, Knowles could not be assigned to any of the artistic isms, such as Expressionism or even the subsequent Verism, and thus escaped any restrictions by the National Socialists on painting.

== Under house arrest ==
When England declared war on Nazi Germany on 3 September 1939, Knowles applied for German citizenship in the district town of Giessen because he believed that it would be better for him to be considered German rather than English. He was told that this would not be possible as long as the war lasted. While imprisonment was no longer a threat to him because of his advanced age, he came under house arrest. As a seventy-six year old, he had only to report to the police in Hungen once a week. [25] Knowles was evidently unaware of the danger he had placed himself in by applying for naturalisation. If the authorities had looked into his application, he might have had to provide evidence of Aryan lineage, which would have led to the discovery that he was half-Jewish. In any case, he remained British until the end of his life.

During the house arrest in Hungen Castle, Knowles and his wife were limited to a few rooms, while the Nazi henchman Alfred Rosenberg, authorised by a decree of the Fuehrer, had the majority of the castle set up as a depot for an inestimable value of looted art. There, "fifty secretaries," [26] working under the supervision of experts, catalogued countless Jewish art treasures, thousands of Jewish books and manuscripts, and the complete library, paintings and cult objects from the Frankfurt Rothschild Museum, all stolen from the areas occupied by the Germans during the war.

== With a white flag and Union Jack to freedom ==
When the 3rd US Armored Division appeared in the forest near Hungen in early January 1945, the eighty-two-year-old Knowles ran across the fields to meet the US forces with a white flag of peace in one hand and the Union Jack waving over his head in the other. No shots were fired after Knowles informed the GIs that the German military and Nazi employees who managed the confiscated Jewish objects had fled Hungen. The city owes it to a Scottish painter that Hungen castle avoided bombardment at the end of World War II. [27]

== After the Second World War ==
After the war, Pitcairn-Knowles and his wife continued to live in Hungen Castle, which, like other castles, soon filled with refugees. On 29 January 1949 he wrote to his sister-in-law in England, that to live in this house: “is getting more and more terrible - the filth that these poor people bring with them is getting worse, and yet still more come. Oh, what a world full of misery.” [28] When Knowles died in 1954, seventy refugees were still living in the castle.

In a letter to his girlfriend, Countess Johanna Solms-Laubach, Knowles wrote of a visit by the art collector Franz Moufang on 19 November 1949. Moufang was then a cultural adviser for the city of Heidelberg and an advisory board member of the Heidelberger Kunstverein.

The evening before his death on 2 January 1954, the ninety-year-old Knowles had been working on a picture. A few days later, various obituaries were broadcast on the radio and printed in the press. [29] The Giessener Freie Presse reprinted an excerpt from an article written by the former painter Editha Klipsteinfor before her death in Laubach in 1953. Although she saw Knowles's painting “in hopeless competition with the photographer” she still liked to “to experience exceptional phenomena, so today I would like to turn my eyes to Pitcairn-Knowles. [...] Pitcairn-Knowles was a disciple of art, but also a loner who never connected to real people. [...] His portraits, which can be seen hanging in castles, in no way resemble the style of the great travelling portraitists, but by adding to the architectural 'rhythm' they are quite suitable in the historical progression, even for distant grandchildren." [30]
