= Konrad Nonn =

Konrad Nonn (26 November 1877 – 13 November 1945) was a German engineer and editor, member of the Nazi Party, and a prominent critic of modernist architecture in Germany between World War I and World War II.

In 1931 Konrad Nonn, along with German architects such as Alexander von Senger, Eugen Hönig, German Bestelmeyer and especially Paul Schultze-Naumburg, were deputized in the National Socialist fight against modern architecture, in a para-governmental propaganda unit called the Kampfbund deutscher Architekten und Ingenieure (KDAI). Through the pages of Völkischer Beobachter and other journals, these architects actively attacked the modern style in openly racist and political tones, placing much of the blame on members of the architectural group The Ring, calling Walter Gropius an "elegant salon-bolshevist", and calling the Bauhaus "the cathedral of Marxism".

From 1935 to 1945 he was a lecturer at Technische Universität Berlin for economic policy foundations of urban development.

== See also ==
- Nazi architecture
