= Eugen Hönig =

German architect (1873–1945)

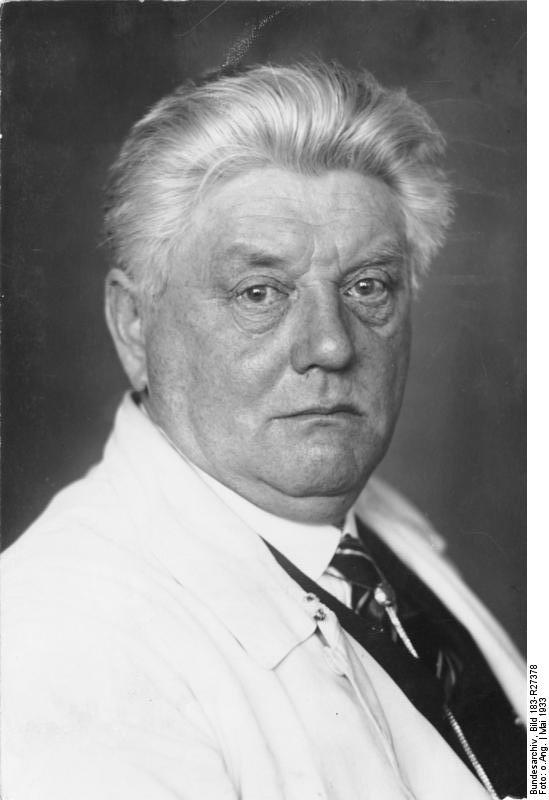
Eugen Hönig

Eugen Hönig (9 March 1873, Kaiserslautern, Kingdom of Bavaria – 24 June 1945) was an architect in Nazi Germany. He was the inaugural president of the Reich Chamber of Culture.

In 1931 Hönig, along with other German architects such as Alexander von Senger, Konrad Nonn, German Bestelmeyer and especially Paul Schultze-Naumburg were deputized in the Nazi campaign against modern architecture, in a para-governmental propaganda unit called the Kampfbund deutscher Architekten und Ingenieure (KDAI). Through the pages of Völkischer Beobachter these architects actively attacked the modern style in racist and political tones, placing much of the blame on members of the architectural group The Ring, calling Walter Gropius an "elegant salon-bolshevist", and calling the Bauhaus "the cathedral of Marxism".

== See also ==
- Nazi architecture
