= Alexander von Senger =

Swiss architect (1880–1968)

Alexander von Senger (7 May 1880 in Geneva – 30 June 1968 in Einsiedeln), was a Swiss architect and architectural theorist.

Hugues Rodolphe Alexandre von Senger was born in Geneva. After his humanistic and technical Matura at the Collège Calvin, he studied at the Swiss Federal Institute of Technologie (Eidgenössische Technische Hochschule) in Zürich, where he obtained 1904 his diploma as architect. He designed the main station of the Swiss Railways in St. Gallen (1911–13) and the main building (Altbau) of the Swiss Reinsurance Company (Swiss Re) in Zürich (1911–14).

In 1931, Senger, along with other Nazi architects such as Eugen Honig, Konrad Nonn, German Bestelmeyer, and especially Paul Schultze-Naumburg were deputized in the Nazi campaign against modern architecture, in a para-governmental propaganda unit called the Kampfbund deutscher Architekten und Ingenieure (KDAI). Through the pages of the official Nazi newspaper, the People's Observer (Völkischer Beobachter), these architects actively attacked the modern style in openly racist and political tones. They placed much of the blame on members of the architectural group "The Ring," calling Walter Gropius an "elegant salon-bolshevist", and calling the Bauhaus "the cathedral of Marxism".

These political connections helped Senger into a professorship at the Technical Hochschule in Munich when increasing political pressure forced out architect Robert Vorhoelzer, who had made the cultural error of modernism in several Bavarian post offices.
