= Mariä Heimsuchung, Wiesbaden =

Mariä Heimsuchung
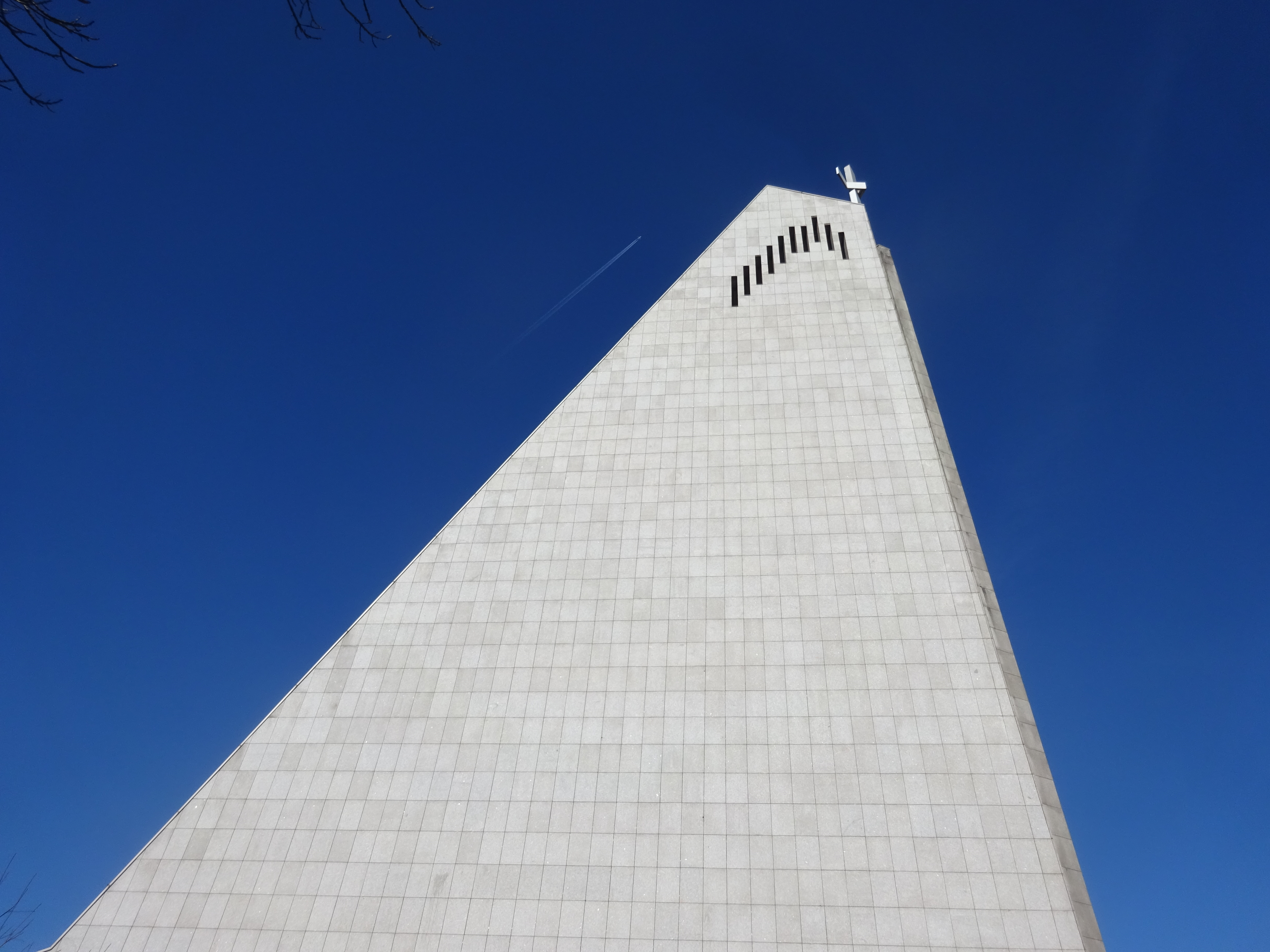
- Mariä Heimsuchung
- 50°04′55″N 08°11′38″E
- Location: Wiesbaden, Hesse, Germany
- Country: Germany
- Denomination: Catholic
- Website: stpeterundpaul-wiesbaden.de/beitrag/kirchort-mariae-heimsuchung/

History
- Status: Parish church
- Dedication: Visitation
- Consecrated: 1966

Architecture
- Functional status: Active

Administration
- Province: Cologne
- Diocese: Limburg

Mariä Heimsuchung (Mary's Visitation) in Wiesbaden, Hesse, Germany, is a Catholic church in Kohlheck, part of Wiesbaden's suburb of Dotzheim, consecrated in 1966. It is dedicated to the Visitation (Heimsuchung). The tall concrete building is a landmark of Wiesbaden. It features two large triptychs by the Wiesbaden painter Otto Ritschl. The parish Mariä Heimsuchung is now part of a larger parish, in the Diocese of Limburg.

== History ==
After World War II, Catholics who came from further east settled in Wiesbaden. Bishop Wilhelm Kempf installed a new parish, Mariä Heimsuchung, in Wiesbaden-Dotzheim in 1960. The church was built on a design by the Berlin architect Johannes Lackel. It was consecrated on 3 July 1966, dedicated to the Visitation.

The shape of the building is a stylised letter "M" as a symbol for Mary, the mother of Jesus, and the floor is the Star of David, indicating that she was Jewish. The materials are predominantly concrete as the common material at the time, also slate and glass. Light comes from the west and illuminates the high wall behind the altar in the east. The interior features two large triptychs by Otto Ritschl from Wiesbaden. The artist created the works in 1973 and 1976 as abstract paintings with large shapes in bold colours, intended to invite to prayer and meditation.

The church is a landmark of Wiesbaden, nicknamed Fingerzeig Gottes (God's finger) or Seelenabschußrampe (launching ramp for souls). Since 1 January 2013, the parish has been part (Kirchort, church location) of the larger parish St. Peter und Paul in Wiesbaden-Schierstein, together with six other parishes in Wiesbaden's west.
