= Erfahrungsfeld zur Entfaltung der Sinne =

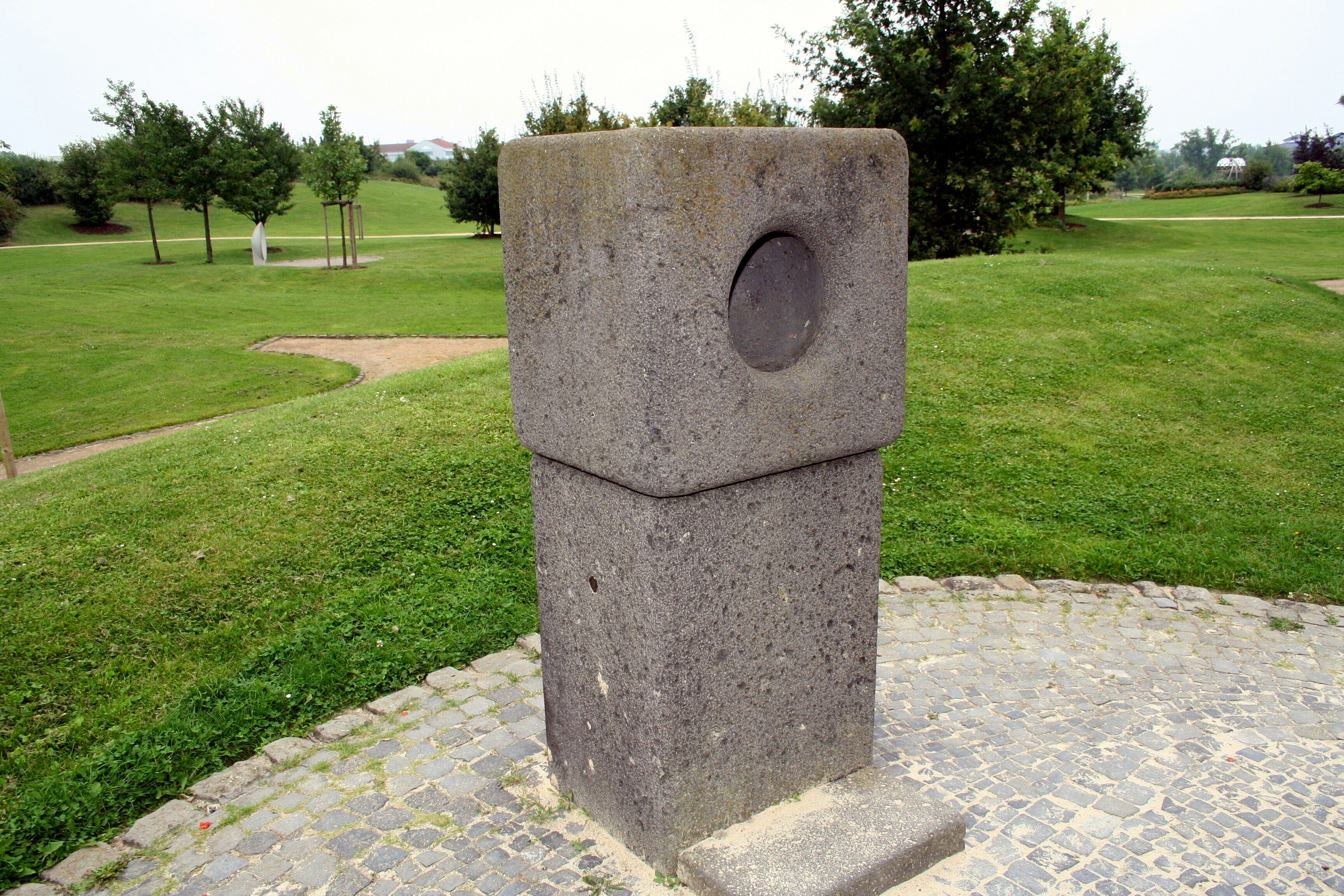
Hear: Humming stone in Laatzen

The Erfahrungsfeld zur Entfaltung der Sinne (English: Field of experiences for the development of the senses) is an interactive exhibition that stimulates all the senses, designed by Hugo Kükelhaus. The different exhibits are intended to inspire the visitor to experiment with them, to explore them, like in a park of the senses or a science center. Kükelhaus constructed 32 pieces of playground equipment for schools in the city of Dortmund and demonstrated some of these equipment at the Expo 67 world exhibition in Montreal. His holistic concept for a large open-air exhibition was shown in the exhibition Phenomena, shown in Rotterdam, South Africa, and Bietigheim, among others.

== Literature ==
- Hugo Kükelhaus: Entfaltung der Sinne, Verlag Schloss Freudenberg, Neuauflage 2008 ISBN 978-3-00-024810-8
- Elisabeth Stelkens: Auf den Spuren des Erfahrungsfeldes, Organismus und Technik e.V., Essen 2007
- Hugo Kükelhaus: Fassen Fühlen Bilden – Organerfahrungen im Umgang mit Phänomenen, Gemeinnützige Forschungs- und Bildungsgesellschaft mbH Eigenverlag; 7. Aufl. 2000, ISBN 3-87732-017-1
- Walter Jäger: Das da draußen sind wir… Bausteine einer Pädagogik der Sinne. 7 Jahre unterwegs mit dem Mobilen Erfahrungsfeld zur Entfaltung der Sinne, Nürnberg, Verlag Modernes Lernen, Dortmund 1997, ISBN 3-8080-0389-8
