= Hugo Kükelhaus =

German philosopher and artist

Hugo Kükelhaus (March 24, 1900 – October 5, 1984) was a German carpenter, writer, pedagogue, philosopher and artist. Kükelhaus is best known for his infant toys "allbedeut" and the "Erfahrungsfeld zur Entfaltung der Sinne." Throughout his life, he presented his views for a human-scaled living environment in talks and publications. He is also regarded as a harbinger for infant toy designs that fulfil the requirements of pedagogy and developmental psychology. He gained international recognition for his design of 30 "Experience stations" at the German Pavilion of the Expo 1967 in Montreal. His ideas are relevant for contemporary theories of intelligence, educational technology and the design of learning environments.

== Childhood and youth ==
Kükelhaus grew up as the oldest of five children in a household that was closely connected to the crafts, his father being chairman of the association of carpenters of the town of Essen and involved in reorganising the associations of vocational professions of the German crafts. In 1919, Kükelhaus finished his Abitur in Essen, began an apprenticeship as a carpenter in Essen and, as a travelling journeyman (Geselle), travelled through Germany, Scandinavia and the Baltics. In 1925, he received his master carpenter's certificate from the chamber of crafts of Arnsberg. In the following years, he read Sociology, Philosophy, Mathematics/Logic and Physiology at the universities of Heidelberg, Münster and Königsberg.

== Writing ==
The close relationship between research and practice was a central theme in every one of Kükelhaus's life achievements. In 1932, he published his first book Das Gesetz des Ebenmasses (The Law of Structure), where he developed on the golden section to canonical figures, by which furniture could be constructed to a human scale. His main work, Urzahl und Gebärde (Primordial Number and Gesture), was published in 1932. This work on numbers as the psychological and physiological foundation of being received great recognition.

Numerous other publications followed as Kükelhaus was still closely related to the crafts: In 1931, following the death of his father, he became the editor of the trade journal Das Tischlergewerk (The Carpenting Trade), where he stayed until 1956. From 1934, he was also a member of staff at the Alfred Metzner publishing house in Berlin, which published the Schriften zur deutschen Handwerkskunst (Writings to the German Arts and Crafts) series (1935 ff) as well as Deutsche Warenkunde (German Journal of product trade), a news service on excellently designed products of trade and industry. He organised exhibitions and gave lectures as well as workshops. At the same time he was a prolific freelance writer and designer.

== Kükelhaus as designer ==
Through his involvement with Fröbelschen Spielgaben, a toy manufacturer, and in a dialogue with Fröbel researcher Erika Hoffmann, he designed the "Allbedeut" toys, dexterity toys for infants, from 1939. Their importance was later underscored by Jean Piaget’s developmental psychology, earning him the Federal Gute Form (Good Form) award in 1971. In 1950, he became an educator at the School of Arts and Crafts in Münster (Werkschule Münster, today the Fachhochschule für Design), and from 1954 on he devoted his efforts to freelancing. As a furniture designer, illustrator, glass artist and sculptor, he was involved designing the interior and exterior of buildings both worldly and sacred. He settled in the mediaeval town of Soest, North Rhine-Westphalia.

== Kükelhaus as a critic of inhuman architecture ==
From 1960 onwards, Kükelhaus intensified his research and experimental studies into the sensory modalities. He took great care in observation and concluded that modern humankind had, in its technical advancement, robbed itself of the fundamental experiences necessary for the development of the body and the senses. He critiqued the increasingly inhumane tendencies of modern architecture of the Seventies, and developed basic principles of "organological" building. He worked on principles of development for spaces for all aspects of life according to the "Functioning principles of the human body." This commitment resulted in the accredited publication Unmenschliche Architektur (1973) (Inhumane architecture), and in consultancy work and artistic involvement regarding appropriate "organic" architecture in schools, kindergartens and factories.

== Experience field for the development of the senses ==
Kükelhaus gained international recognition through his Experience field for the development of the senses, presented at the 1967 World Expo in Montreal in form of 30 different experience exhibits. At the centre of these exhibits stands experiencing the world with the senses and an awareness for the body, as opposed to a purely intellectual engagement with the world. In the foreground is the corporeal and physical engagement with roundabouts, swings or the texture of the ground beneath the visitors feet. These experiential exhibits are manifestations of his phenomenology of consciousness regarding the learning process as a psycho-physiological experience: Learning through the body.

== Quotes ==
"What exhausts us is not making use of the possibilities of our organs and senses, their subjugation and suppression. What constitutes them is development. Development through the engagement with a world that wholly challenges me."

"The development of man is optimally supported by that environment which provides multifarious well-proportioned stimulations. Notwithstanding the question if this world of stimuli consists of physical or social circumstances and factors – its multifariousness is life’s condition."

"We have for centuries sought to replace experience with knowledge. What a spare world we now live in!"
