= Paul Schultze-Naumburg =

German architect (1869–1949)

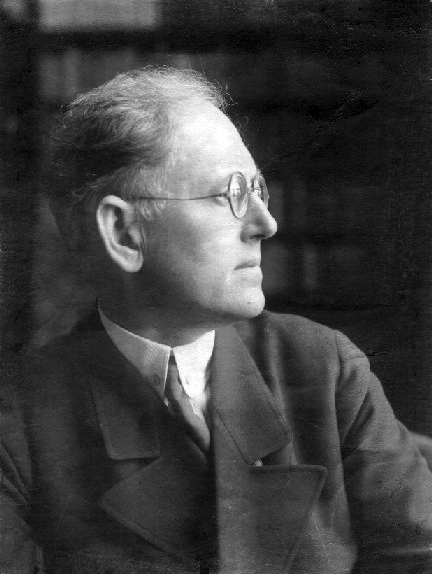
Paul Schultze-Naumburg, 1919

Paul Schultze-Naumburg (10 June 1869 – 19 May 1949) was a German traditionalist architect, painter, publicist and author. A leading critic of modern architecture, he joined the Nazi Party in 1930 (aged 61) and became an important advocate of Nazi architecture.

== Life ==
Schultze-Naumburg was born in Almrich (now part of Naumburg) in the current federal state of Saxony-Anhalt and, by 1900, was a well-known painter and architect, emerging as a more-conservative member of the group of artists who established the Jugendstil and the Arts and Crafts workshops in Munich. His series of books the Kulturarbeiten ("Works of Culture"), nine volumes published 1900–1917, were extremely popular and established him as an important tastemaker for the German middle class. By the First World War, he had become a strong proponent of traditional architecture, an originator of the "Circa 1800" movement, and an important voice in both the Deutscher Werkbund, and the nationalist German architecture and landscape preservation movement. A well-known example of his architecture from that time is the Cecilienhof Palace in Potsdam, built in 1914–1917, on the orders of Wilhelm II, for his son, crown prince Wilhelm.

On 5 January 1922, Paul Schultze-Naumburg married in Saaleck Margarete Karolina Berta Dörr (1896–1960). They were childless and divorced unpleasantly on 7 February 1934. A couple of weeks later, Margarete married the Reich Minister of the Interior Wilhelm Frick.

In response to Germany's defeat in the First World War, and of his own traditionalist marginalization in the interwar "progressive" architectural discourse, Schultze-Naumburg's articles and books began to take on a far more robust character, condemning modern art and architecture in racial terms, thereby providing some of the basis for Adolf Hitler's theories, in which classical Greece and the Middle Ages were the true sources of Aryan art. Schultze-Naumburg wrote books such as Die Kunst der Deutschen. Ihr Wesen und ihre Werke ("The Art of the Germans. Its Nature and Its Works") and Kunst und Rasse ("Art and Race"), the latter published in 1928, in which he argued that only "racially pure" artists could produce a healthy art which upheld timeless ideals of classical beauty, while racially "mixed" modern artists showed their inferiority and corruption by producing distorted artwork. As evidence of that, he reproduced examples of modern art next to photographs of people with deformities and diseases, graphically reinforcing the idea of modernism as a sickness.

After joining the Nazi Party in 1930, Schultze-Naumburg was elected to the Reichstag on the Nazi electoral list in July 1932 and in the following two elections. At the election of November 1933, he was elected as a deputy from electoral constituency 11 (Merseburg) and retained that seat until the collapse of the Nazi regime.

Along with Alexander von Senger, Eugen Honig, Konrad Nonn and German Bestelmeyer, Schultze-Naumburg was a member of a Nazi para-governmental art propaganda unit called the Kampfbund deutscher Architekten und Ingenieure (KDAI) (Combat Association of German Architects and Engineers). In September 1944, Schultze-Naumburg was named in the Gottbegnadeten list as one of the first rank of artists and writers important to Nazi culture.

Schultze-Naumburg died in Jena in 1949. His ashes were placed in the Weimar Historical Cemetery, in a mausoleum designed by him in 1909 for the poet Ernst von Wildenbruch.

== Works ==
In addition to his publications mentioned above, others are here. This is not a complete list. His books were very popular, were reprinted many times, and remain available today.

- Häusliche Kunstpflege (Leipzig 1900).
- Kunst und Kunstpflege (Leipzig 1901).
- Technik der Malerei: ein Handbuch fur Kunstler und Dilettanten (1901)
- Kulturarbeiten (1904)
- Das Studium und die Ziele der Malerei (1905)
- Die Entstellung unsres Landes (Munich 1908)
- Die Kultur des weiblichen Körpers als Grundlage der Frauenkleidung (Jena 1912)
- Die Gestaltung der Landschaft durch den Menschen. Zweiter Band: III: "Der geologische Aufbau der Landschaft und die Nutzbarmachung der Mineralien IV. Die Wasserwirtschaft" (Munich 1922/8)
- Flaches oder geneigtes Dach? : mit einer Rundfrage an deutsche Architekten und deren Antworten (Berlin 1927)
- Kunst und Rasse, Munich 1928, 4th edition 1942
- Bildmäßige Photographie, Mit 60 Bildbeispielen (Munich 1938)

== Selected projects ==
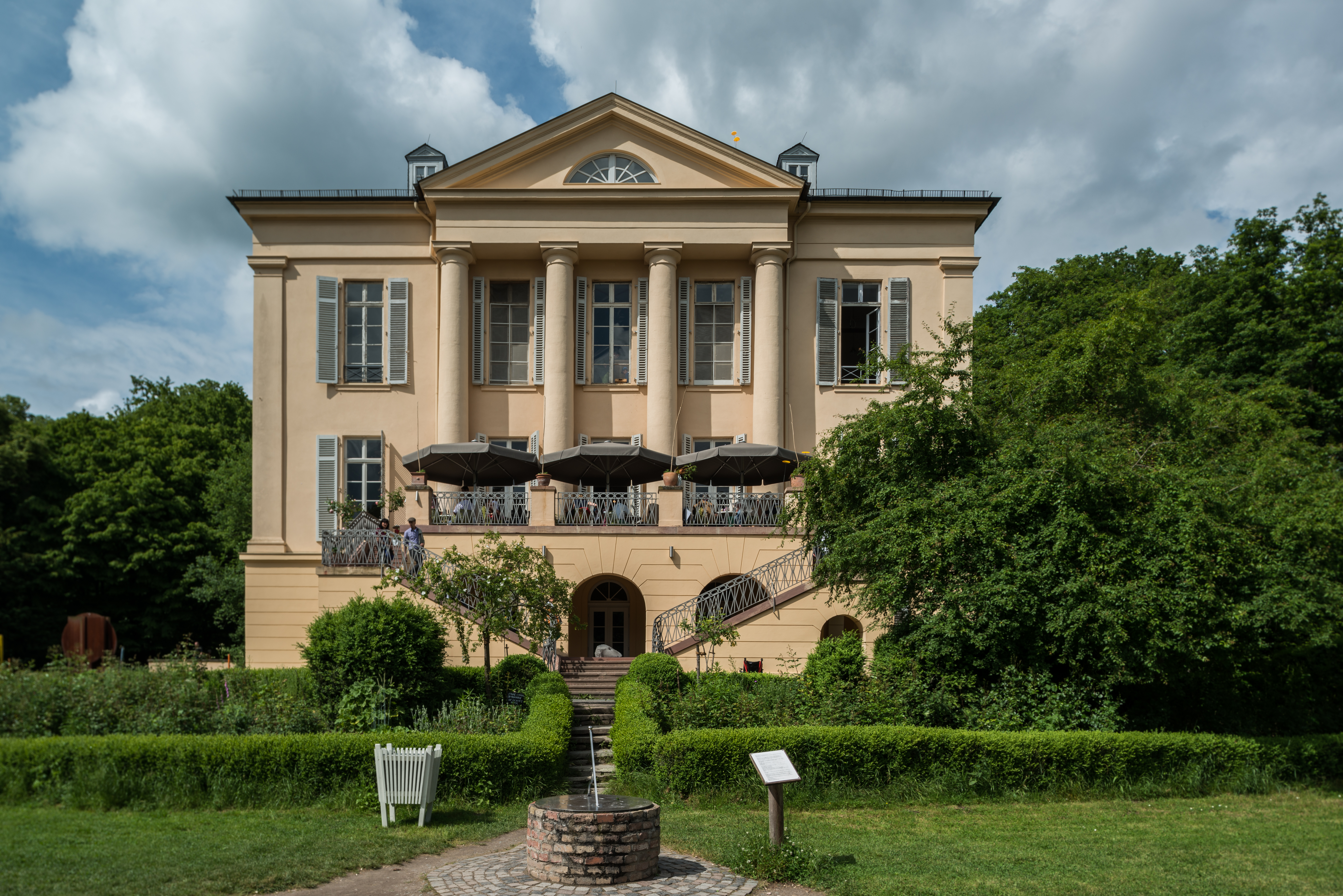
Schloss Freudenberg in Wiesbaden

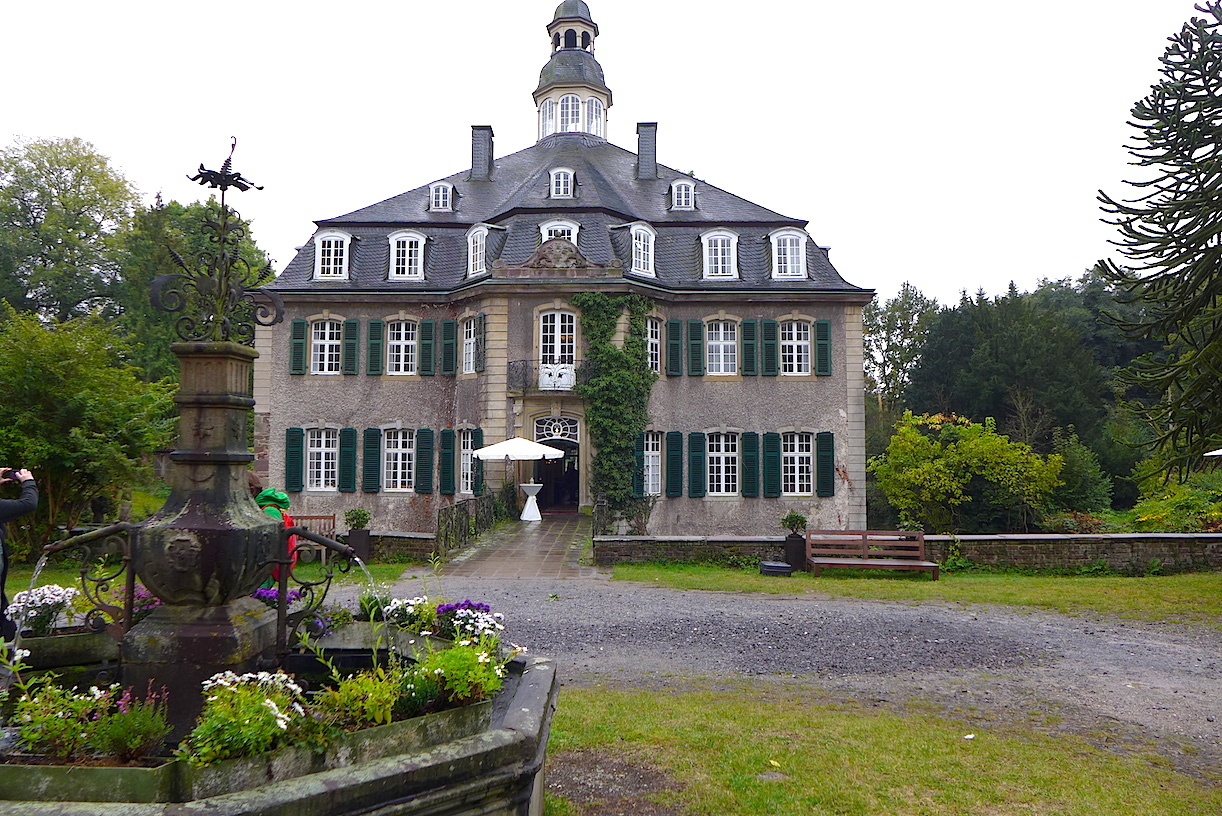
Schloss Hackhausen in Solingen

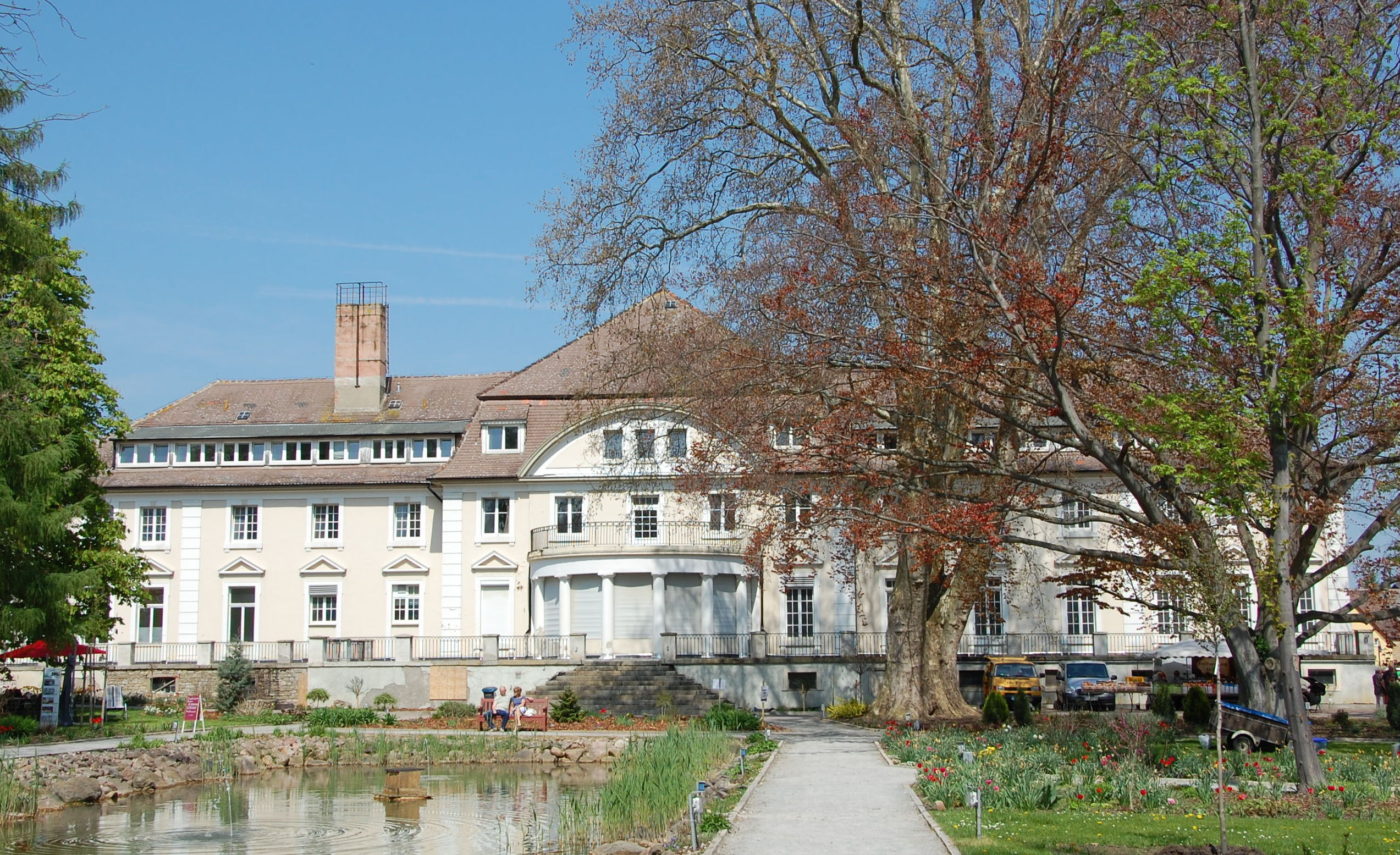
Schloss Bahrendorf in Sülzetal

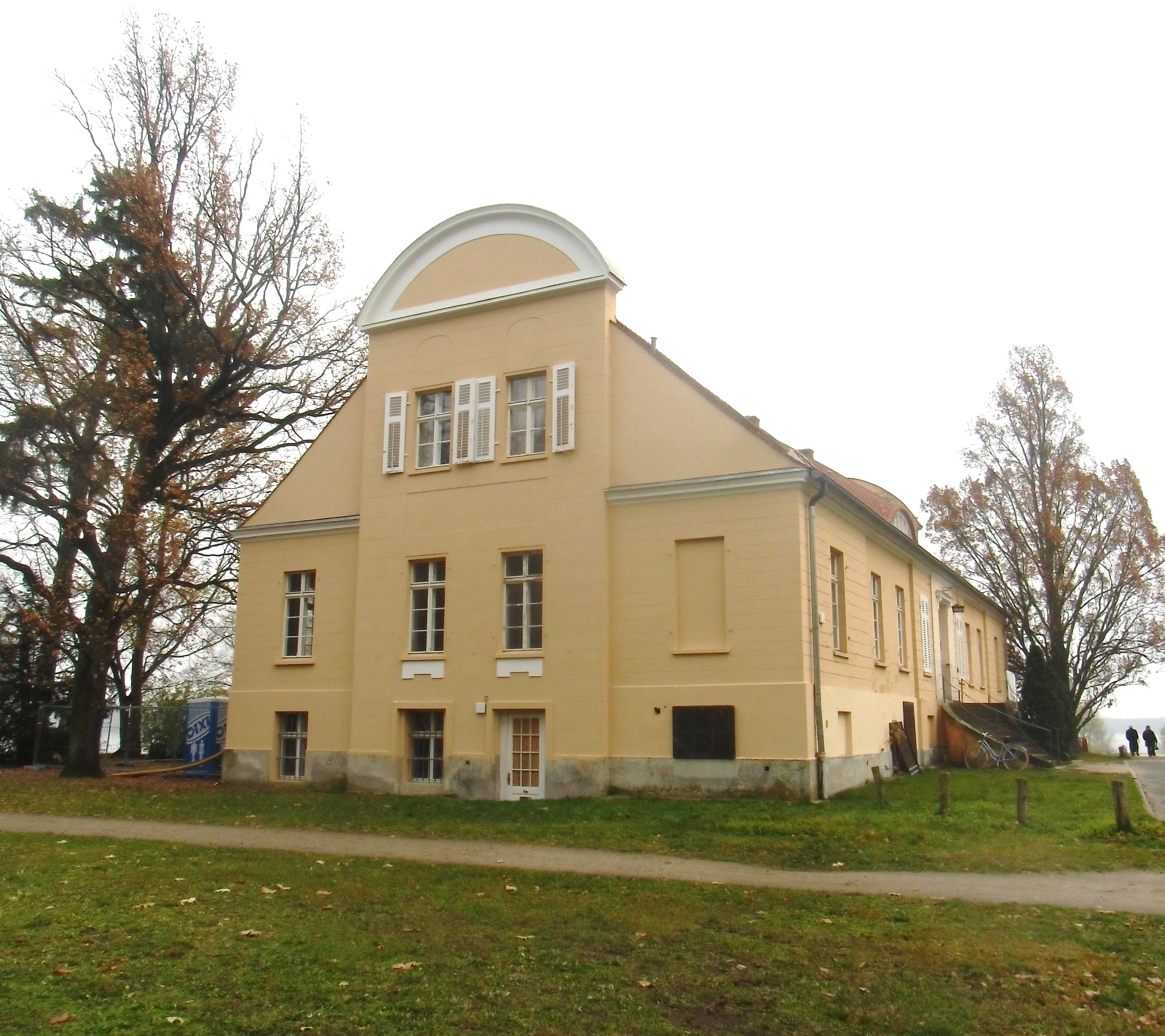
Guest house in Kladow

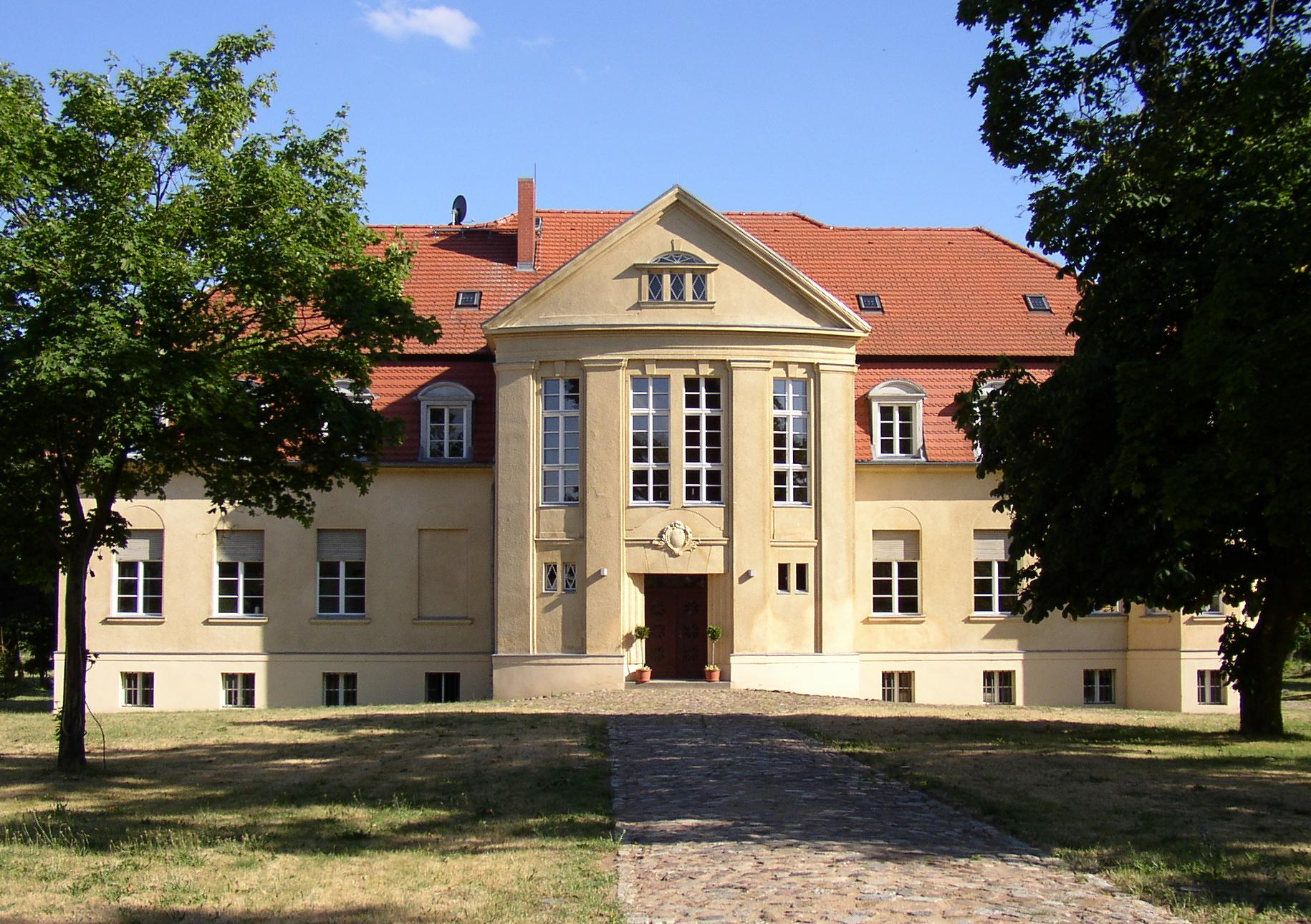
Manor in Grabow bei Blumenthal

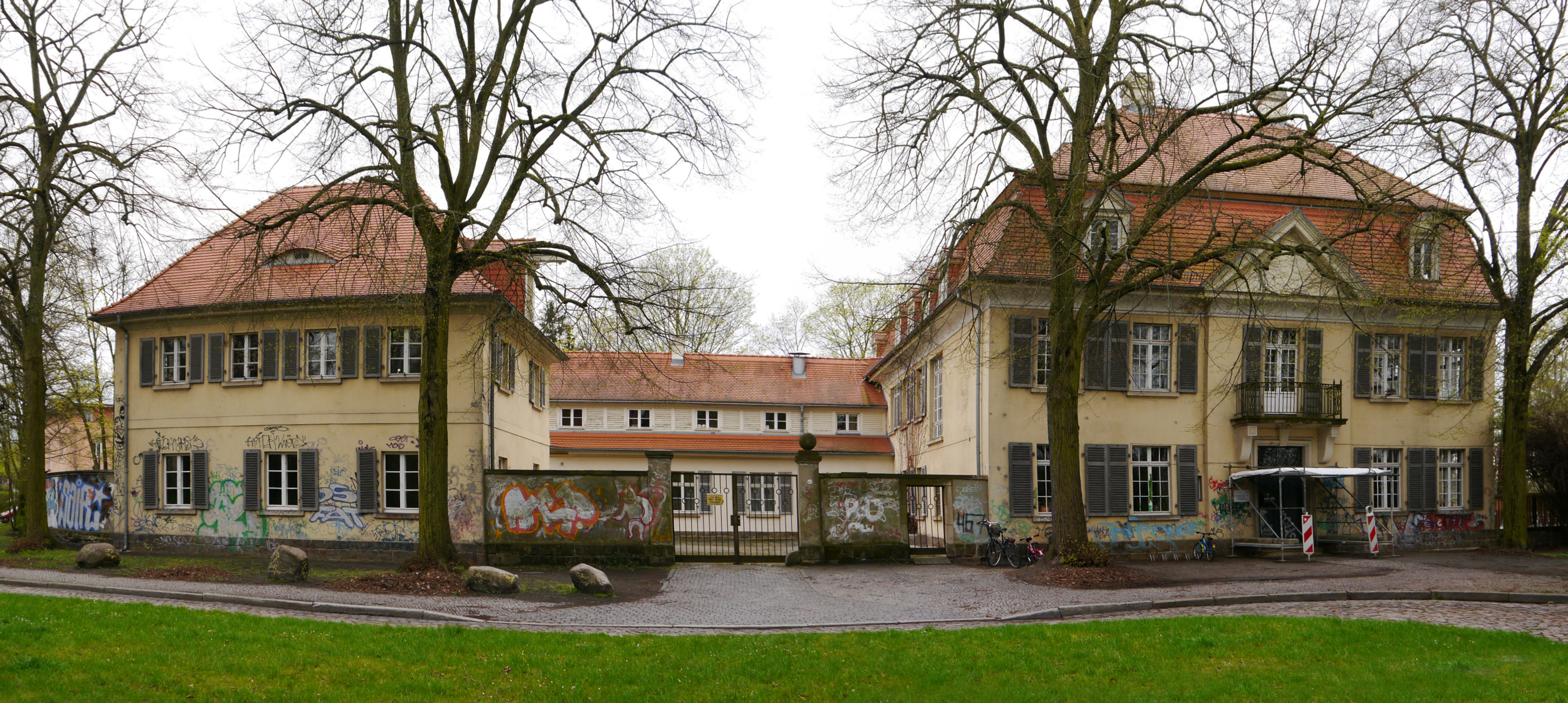
Country home in Potsdam

== See also ==
- List of German artists

== Bibliography ==
- Jose-Manuel GARCÍA ROIG, "Tres arquitectos del periodo guillermino. Hermman Muthesius. Paul Schultze-Naumburg. Paul Mebes", Valladolid (Spain), 2006, ISBN 978-84-8448-370-0, Universidad de Valladolid, Spain
