= Étienne =

- Pronunciation: IPA: [etjɛn]
- Gender: Male; Female in Brazil

Other names
- Related names: Stephen/Steven

Étienne, a French analog of Stephen or Steven, is a masculine given name. An archaic variant of the name, prevalent up to the mid-17th century, is Estienne.

Étienne, Etienne, Ettiene, Estienne, or Ettienne may refer to:

== People ==
=== Artists and entertainers ===
- Etienne Aigner (1904–2000), Hungarian-born Austrian fashion designer
- Etienne Bowler (born 1986), American drummer and member of Misterwives
- Étienne Chatiliez (born 1952), French film director
- Étienne de Crécy (born 1969), French electronic music producer and DJ
- Étienne Daho (born 1956), French singer, songwriter and record producer
- Etienne Debel (1931–1993), Belgian actor and director
- Étienne Doirat (c. 1675–1732), French furniture designer
- Étienne Maurice Falconet (1716–1791), French Rococo sculptor
- Etienne Girardot (1856–1939), Anglo-French actor
- Étienne Jodelle, seigneur de Limodin (1532–1573), French dramatist and poet
- Étienne Loulié (1654–1702), French musician, pedagogue and musical theorist
- Étienne Mallarmé (1842–1898), French Symbolist poet and critic known professionally as Stéphane Mallarmé
- Étienne Méhul (1763–1817), French composer
- Étienne Moulinié (1599–1676), French Baroque composer
- Étienne Périer (director) (1931–2020), Belgian film director
- Étienne Pradeau (1817–1895), French singer and actor

=== Intellectuals and academics ===
- Étienne Balazs (1905–1963), Hungarian-born French sinologist
- Étienne Balibar (born 1942), French Marxist philosopher and professor
- Étienne Baluze (1630–1718), French scholar also known as Stephanus Baluzius
- Étienne de La Boétie (1530–1563), French intellectual and noted friend of Michel de Montaigne
- Étienne Cabet (1788–1856), French philosopher and utopian socialist
- Étienne Bonnot de Condillac (1715–1780), French philosopher
- Étienne Dolet (1509–1546), French scholar, translator and printer
- Étienne Fourmont (1683–1745), French orientalist
- Étienne Gilson (1884–1978), French philosopher
- Étienne Hubert (Arabist) (1567–1614), French physician, Orientalist and diplomat, also known as Stephanus Hubertus
- Étienne Lamotte (1903–1983), Belgian priest, Indologist and authority on Buddhism
- Étienne Léopold Trouvelot
- Etienne Vermeersch (1934–2019), Belgian philosopher
- Étienne Weill-Raynal (1887–1982), French historian, resistant, journalist and Socialist politician
- Étienne Wenger (born 1952), education theorist

=== Politicians, government officials and soldiers ===
- Étienne François, duc de Choiseul (1719–1785), French military officer, statesman and diplomat
- Étienne Bazeries (1846–1931), French military cryptanalyst
- Étienne Eustache Bruix (1759–1805), French Navy admiral
- Étienne Clavière (1735–1793), Swiss-born French financier and politician of the French Revolution
- Étienne Clémentel (1864–1936), French politician
- Étienne Compayré (1748–1817), French politician
- Étienne Davignon (born 1932), Belgian politician, businessman and former vice-president of the European Commission
- Étienne Grandmont (born 1977), a Canadian politician in the province of Québec
- Étienne Jacques Macdonald (1765–1840), Marshal of the Empire
- Étienne Maurice Gérard, comte Gérard (1773–1852), French general and statesman
- Étienne Guy (1774–1820), surveyor and politician in Lower Canada
- Etienne van der Horst (born 1958), Curaçaoan politician
- Etyen Mahçupyan (born 1950), Turkish-Armenian journalist, writer and politician
- Étienne Manac'h (1910–1992), French diplomat and writer
- Étienne Marcel (died 1358), provost of the merchants of Paris under King John II
- Étienne Parent (1802–1874), Canadian journalist and government official
- Étienne Perier (governor) (1687–1766), French naval officer and colonial administrator
- Étienne Richaud (1841–1889), Governor of French India
- Etienne Saqr (born 1937), Lebanese founder of the Guardians of the Cedars militia and political party
- Étienne Tshisekedi (1932–2017), politician in the Democratic Republic of the Congo
- Étienne de Vignolles (1390–1443), called La Hire, a French military commander during the Hundred Years' War and a close comrade of Joan of Arc
- Etienne Ys (born 1962), twice Prime Minister of the Netherlands Antilles

=== Scientists and inventors ===
- Étienne Bézout (1730–1783), French mathematician
- Étienne Louis Geoffroy (1725–1810), French entomologist and pharmacist
- Étienne Laspeyres (1834–1913), German professor of economics and statistics
- Étienne Lenoir (1822–1900), Belgian engineer who invented the first internal combustion engine to be produced in numbers
- Étienne Lenoir (instrument maker) (1744–1832), French scientific instrument maker and inventor of the repeating circle surveying instrument
- Étienne Mulsant (1797–1880), French entomologist and ornithologist
- Étienne Pascal (1588–1651), French lawyer, scientist and mathematician best known as the father of Blaise Pascal
- Étienne Geoffroy Saint-Hilaire (1772–1844), French naturalist
- Étienne Pierre Ventenat (1757–1808), French botanist
- Étienne Wasserzug (1860–1888), French biologist

=== Sportsmen ===
- Étienne Bally (1923–2018), French sprinter
- Etienne Barbara (born 1982), Maltese footballer
- Étienne Bastier (born 2004), French short-track speed skater
- Étienne Boulay (born 1983), Canadian football player
- Étienne Capoue (born 1988), French footballer
- Étienne Dagon (born 1960), Swiss breaststroke swimmer
- Etienne Daguinos (born 2000), French runner
- Ettiene de Bruyn (born 1977), South African cricketer
- Étienne Desmarteau (1873–1905), Canadian winner of the 54 pound weight throw at the 1904 Olympics
- Étienne Didot (born 1983), French footballer
- Etienne Eto'o (born 1990), Cameroonian footballer
- Étienne Mattler (1905–1986), French footballer
- Etienne L. de Mestre (1832–1916), Australian racehorse trainer
- Etienne Oosthuizen (rugby union, born 1992), South African rugby union player
- Etienne Oosthuizen (rugby union, born 1994), South African rugby union player
- Ettienne Richardson (born 1981), Grenadian footballer
- Ettiene Smit (born 1974), South African strongman competitor
- Etienne Stott (born 1979), English slalom canoeist

=== Other fields ===
- Étienne Bacrot (born 1983), French chess player, formerly the youngest Grandmaster
- Étienne Brûlé (c. 1592–c. 1643), French explorer in what is now Canada
- Étienne Gaboury (1930–2022), Canadian architect
- Étienne Pasquier (1529–1615), French lawyer and man of letters
- Étienne Pernet (1824–1899), French Roman Catholic priest, founder of Little Sisters of the Assumption Order
- Étienne Provost (1785–1850), French-Canadian fur trader
- Étienne Tempier (died 1279), French bishop of Paris and Chancellor of the Sorbonne

== Fictional characters ==
- Étienne of Navarre, a main character in Ladyhawke, a 1985 historical-fantasy, played by Rutger Hauer
- Ettienne R. LaFitte, "real" name of Gung-Ho (G.I. Joe)
- Étienne Lantier, protagonist of Émile Zola's novel Germinal
- Etienne LeBlanc, a main character in the novel All the Light We Cannot See by Anthony Doerr
- Étienne St. Clair, a main character in the novel Anna and the French Kiss by Stephanie Perkins
- Etienne, a hero tower drone pilot in Bloons TD 6

== See also ==
- Saint Etienne (disambiguation)
- Jean-Étienne
- Stéphane
