= István =

István (pronounced [ˈiʃtvaːn]) is a Hungarian language equivalent of the name Stephen or Stefan. It may refer to:

== People with the given name ==
=== Nobles, palatines and judges royal ===
- Stephen I of Hungary (c. 975–1038), last grand prince of the Hungarians and first king of Hungary
- Stephen Rozgonyi (died after 1440), ispán (Count) of Temes County
- Stephen III Báthory (died 1444), Palatine of Hungary
- Stephen V Báthory (1430–1493), Hungarian commander, judge royal and Voivode of Transylvania
- Stephen VIII Báthory (1477–1534), Voivode of Transylvania
- Stephen VII Báthory (1480–1530), Count of Temesvár and Palatine of Hungary
- Stephen Báthory (1533–1586), Voivode of Transylvania, Prince of Transylvania, King of Poland and Grand Duke of Lithuania
- Stephen Báthory (1555–1605), judge royal of the Kingdom of Hungary
- Stephen Bocskai (1557–1606), Prince of Transylvania and Hungary
- Stephen Bethlen (1582–1648), Prince of Transylvania

=== Politicians ===
- István Balogh (politician) (1894–1976), Hungarian Catholic priest and anti-communist politician
- István Bethlen (1874–1946), Prime Minister of Hungary
- István Bethlen (born 1946) (1946–2018), Hungarian economist and politician
- István Bibó (1911–1979), Hungarian lawyer, civil servant, politician and political theorist
- István Bittó (1822–1903), Hungarian politician, Prime Minister of Hungary
- István Dobi (1898–1968), Hungarian politician, Prime Minister of Hungary
- István Farkas de Boldogfa (1875–1921), Hungarian nobleman and jurist
- István Friedrich (1883–1951), Hungarian politician, footballer and factory owner, Prime Minister of Hungary for three months
- István Gorove (1819–1881), Hungarian politician and cabinet minister
- István Hiller (born 1964), Hungarian politician and cabinet minister
- István Horthy (1904–1942), Hungarian World War II anti-Nazi politician and fighter pilot
- István Nagy (politician, born 1954), Hungarian politician
- István Nagy (politician, born 1967), Hungarian agrarian engineer and politician
- István Pálfi (1966–2006), Hungarian politician
- István Pásztor (politician) (1956–2023), Serbian politician
- István Széchenyi (1791–1860), Hungarian politician, political theorist and writer
- István Szent-Iványi (born 1958), Hungarian politician and diplomat
- István Tisza (1861–1918), Hungarian politician, Prime Minister, political scientist, international lawyer and macroeconomist
- István Varga (politician, born 1953), Hungarian lawyer and politician
- István Varga (politician, born 1956), Hungarian politician, economist and former Minister of National Development and Economy
- István Werbőczy (1458–1541), Hungarian legal theorist, statesman and theologian, author of the Hungarian Customary Law

=== Musicians and artists ===
- István Árkossy (born 1943), Hungarian painter and graphic artist
- István Cserháti (1954–2005), Hungarian hard rock keyboardist
- István Csók (1865–1961), Hungarian painter
- István Ferenczy (1792–1856), Hungarian sculptor
- Istvan Kantor (born 1949), Canadian performance and video artist and industrial music and electropop singer
- István Kertész (conductor) (1929–1973), Hungarian orchestral and operatic conductor
- István Kiss (sculptor) (1927–1997), Hungarian sculptor
- István Láng (1933–2023), Hungarian composer and academic teacher
- István Nagy (painter) (1873–1937), Hungarian painter
- István Orosz (born 1951), Hungarian painter, printmaker, graphic designer and animated film director

=== Authors ===
- István Fekete (1900–1970), Hungarian writer, author of several youth novels and animal stories
- István Küzmics (1723–1779), the most important Lutheran writer of the Slovenes in Hungary
- István Zsemlics (1840–1891), Slovene author and Catholic priest

=== Academics ===
- István Fáry (1922–1984), Hungarian mathematician
- István Gyöngy (born 1951), Hungarian mathematician
- István Hatvani (1718–1786), Hungarian mathematician
- István Hont (1947–2013), Hungarian-born British historian of economics and political thought
- István Mészáros (philosopher) (1930–2017), Hungarian Marxist philosopher
- István Perczel (born 1951), Hungarian historian

=== Chess players ===
- István Bilek (1932–2010), Hungarian chess grandmaster
- István Csom (1940–2021), Hungarian chess grandmaster and International Arbiter
- István Fazekas (1898–1967), Hungarian–British chess master

=== Sportspeople ===
- István Avar (1905–1977), football player and manager who played for both Hungary and Romania
- István Bagyula (born 1969), Hungarian retired pole vaulter
- Istvan Bakx (born 1986), Dutch footballer
- István Balogh (footballer) (1912–1992), Hungarian footballer
- István Bárány (1907–1995), Hungarian swimmer
- István Beé (born 1972), Hungarian sprint canoer
- István Csopaki (born 1983), Hungarian footballer
- István Déván (1890–1977), Hungarian sprinter and cross-country skier
- István Donogán (1897–1966), Hungarian discus thrower
- István Énekes (1911–1940), Hungarian boxer
- István Ferenczi (born 1977), Hungarian footballer
- István Géczi (1944–2018), Hungarian football goalkeeper
- István Gulyás (1931–2000), Hungarian tennis player
- István Havasi (1930–2003), Hungarian race walker
- István Herczeg (1887–1949), Hungarian gymnast
- István Juhász (canoeist) (born 2005), Hungarian canoeist
- István Kiss (decathlete) (1924–2011), Hungarian decathlete; see 1946 European Athletics Championships – Men's decathlon
- István Kiss (footballer) (born 1970), Hungarian footballer
- István Kiss (gymnast) (born 1948), Hungarian Olympic gymnast
- István Kiss (long-distance runner) (born 1940), Hungarian long-distance runner; see 1966 European Athletics Championships – Men's 5000 metres
- István Kiss (water polo) (born 1958), Hungarian former water polo player
- István Kocsis (footballer, born 1949) (1949–1994), Hungarian footballer
- István Kocsis (footballer, born 1976), Hungarian footballer
- István Kovács (boxer) (born 1970), Hungarian retired world and Olympic champion boxer
- István Kövesfalvi (born 1968), Hungarian footballer
- István Kozma (footballer) (born 1964), Hungarian former footballer
- István Kozma (wrestler) (1939–1970), Hungarian wrestler
- István Lakatos (born 1999), Hungarian footballer
- István Lang (1933–2007), Hungarian cyclist
- István Lévai (born 1957), Hungarian retired boxer
- István Major (1949–2014), Hungarian high jumper
- István Markóczi (born 1966), Hungarian footballer
- István Molnár (water polo) (1913–1983), Hungarian water polo player
- István Mudin (1881–1918), Hungarian athlete who competed in the throwing events and the pentathlon
- István Nagy (athlete) (born 1959), Hungarian sprinter
- István Nagy (footballer, born 1939) (1939–1999), Hungarian footballer
- István Nagy (footballer, born 1986), Hungarian footballer
- István Nyers (1924–2005), Hungarian footballer
- István Pelle (1907–1986), Hungarian gymnast
- István Reszeli Soós (1962–2015), Hungarian football manager
- István Rózsavölgyi (1929–2012), Hungarian middle-distance runner
- István Séllyei (1950–2020), Hungarian wrestler
- István Serényi (1911–1996), Hungarian field handball player
- István Somodi (1885–1963), Hungarian high jumper
- István Stefanov (1964–2024), Hungarian footballer
- István Szabó (handballer) (born 1945), Hungarian handball player
- István Szabó (canoeist) (born 1950), Hungarian sprint canoer
- István Szilágyi (born 1950), Hungarian handball player
- István Szőke (1947–2022), Hungarian footballer
- István Sztáni (born 1937), Hungarian football manager and former player
- István Takács (born 2000), Hungarian Greco-Roman wrestler
- István Tóth (canoeist), Hungarian sprint canoer in the 1980s
- István Tóth (footballer) (1891–1945), Hungarian amateur footballer, manager and coach
- István Tóth (wrestler) (born 1951), Hungarian wrestler
- István Varga (footballer, born 1963), Hungarian footballer
- István Varga (handballer) (1943–2014), Hungarian handball player
- István Varga (judoka) (born 1960), Hungarian judoka
- István Vaskuti (born 1955), Hungarian sprint canoer
- István Verpecz (born 1987), Hungarian footballer
- István Vincze (born 1967), Hungarian football manager and former football player
- István Vituska (born 1988), Hungarian footballer

=== Other ===
- István Básthy (1896–1970), Hungarian art director
- István Dobó (c. 1502–1572), Hungarian soldier and baron
- István Kiss (architect) (1857–1902), Hungarian architect
- István Mihály (1892–1945), Hungarian screenwriter
- Stephen Pongracz (1584–1619), Hungarian Jesuit priest, martyr and saint
- István Vágó (1949–2023), Hungarian television host and political activist
