= Estevan (disambiguation) =

Estevan is an alternative spelling of Esteban, the Spanish variant of the first name Stephen. It can refer to:

Places

- Estevan, a city in Saskatchewan, Canada
- Rural Municipality of Estevan No. 5, rural municipality
- San Estevan, Belize, a town in Orange Walk District, Belize
- Estevan Point, a lighthouse in Vancouver Island, Canada

== See also ==
- Stephen
- Esteban (name)
