= Stéphen =

Stéphen is a French masculine given name. It may refer to:

- Stéphen Boyer (born 1996), French volleyball player
- Stéphen Chauvet (1885–1950), French writer
- Stéphen Drouin (born 1984), French footballer
- Stéphen Liégeard (1830–1925), French lawyer, politician and writer
- Stéphen Vincent (born 1986), French footballer

== See also ==
- Stephen
- Étienne
- Stéphane
