= Steve (disambiguation) =

Steve is a masculine given name.

Steve may also refer to:

- STEVE (strong thermal emission velocity enhancement), an atmospheric phenomenon
- Steve (2010 film), a short film by Rupert Friend
- Steve (2025 film), a feature film by Tim Mielants
- Steve (talk show), an American talk show hosted by comedian Steve Harvey
- Handsome Steve, a fictional character from the animated series Super Duper Bunny League

== See also ==
- Project Steve, a tongue-in-cheek list of scientists
- Stef (disambiguation)
- Stephen (disambiguation)
- Stevedore
- Steven
- Steeves, surname
- Stevie (disambiguation)
- Steve's Ice Cream
