= Stephen =

- 15th-century portrait of Saint Stephen by Carlo Crivelli
- Pronunciation: /ˈstiːvən/ STEE-vən
- Gender: Male

Origin
- Origin: Greek
- Meaning: Wreath, crown, honour, reward, royalty, renown, fame

Other names
- Alternative spelling: Steven
- Nicknames: Steve, Stevie, Steph
- Derived: Στέφανος (Stéphanos)
- Related names: Stephan, Stjepan, Ștefan, Stefan, Stepan, Stefano, Stefani, Steph, Stevo, Steffen, Sten, Swen, Étienne, Estêvão, Esteban, István, Stephanie (feminine form)
- See also: Robert, Rudolph, Roger, Louis, Ludwig, Luigi, Timothy, Waldemar, Vladimir

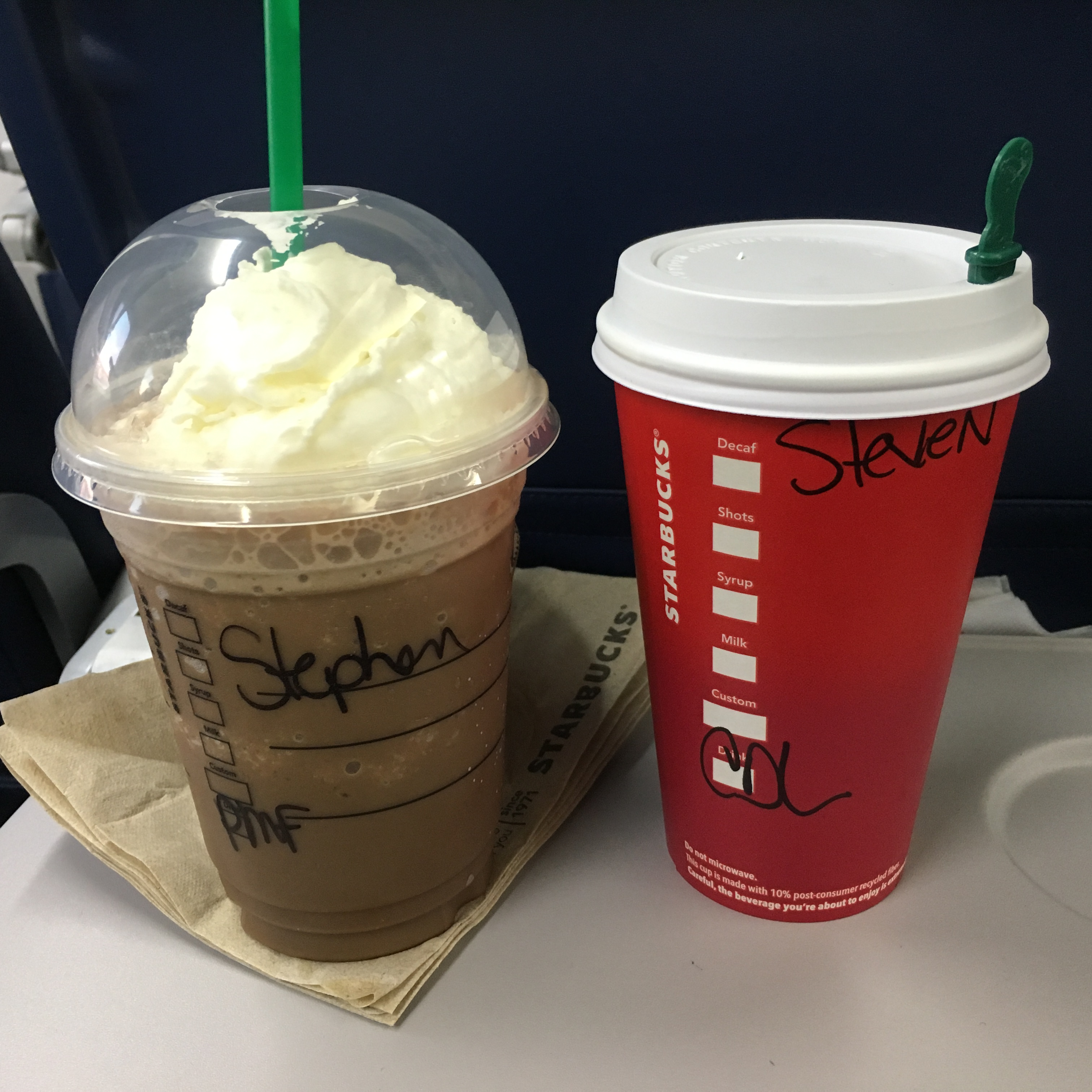
Both common spellings of the name on a Starbucks Red Cup and clear cup

Stephen or Steven is an English male first name. It is particularly significant to Christians, as it belonged to Saint Stephen (Ancient Greek: Στέφανος, romanized: Stéphanos, lit. 'wreath, crown'), an early disciple and deacon who, according to the Book of Acts, was stoned to death; he is widely regarded as the first martyr (or "protomartyr") of the Christian Church.

The name, in both the forms Stephen and Steven, is often shortened to Steve or Stevie. In English, the female version of the name is Stephanie.

Many surnames are derived from the first name, including Stephens, Stevens, Stephenson, and Stevenson, all of which mean "Stephen's (son)". In modern times the name has sometimes been given with intentionally non-standard spelling, such as Stevan or Stevon. A common variant of the name used in English is Stephan (/ˈstɛfən/ STEF-ən); related names that have found some currency or significance in English include Stefan (pronounced /ˈstɛfən/ STEF-ən or /stəˈfɑːn/ stə-FAHN in English), Esteban (often pronounced /ˈɛstɪbæn/ EST-ib-an), and the Shakespearean Stephano (/ˈstɛfənoʊ/ STEF-ən-oh).

== Origins ==
The name "Stephen" (and its common variant "Steven") is derived from Greek Στέφανος (Stéphanos), a first name from the Greek word στέφανος (stéphanos), meaning 'wreath, crown' and by extension 'reward, honor, renown, fame', from the verb στέφειν (stéphein), 'to encircle, to wreathe'. In Ancient Greece, crowning wreaths (such as laurel wreaths) were given to the winners of contests. Originally, as the verb suggests, the noun had a more general meaning of any "circle" – including a circle of people, a circling wall around a city, and, in its earliest recorded use, the circle of a fight, which is found in the Iliad of Homer.

== Variants in other languages ==
Like all biblical names, Stephen has forms in other world languages. Among them are:

- Esteban – Spanish, Filipino
- Estebão – Old Portuguese
- Estepan, Estebe, Extiban, Estevan – Old Spanish
- Estevão – Portuguese
- Esteve – Catalan
- Estevo – Galician
- Étienne ("Estienne" is an archaic spelling), Stéphan, Stéphane, Stéphen, Stéfane, Stéphanne – French
- İstefanos, Stefan – Turkish
- İstfan, Stepan – Azeri
- István, Stefán, Csépán – Hungarian
- Estebe, Eztebe – Basque
- Sitiveni – Fijian
- Steafán, Stiofán, Steabhán – Irish
- Štefan – Slovak, Slovene
- Stefan, Shtjefën, Fan – Albanian
- Stef, Stefan, Stephan, Steven, Stefanus, Steffen, Stefaan, Stefans – Afrikaans, Dutch
- Stefan, Stephan, Steffen – German
- Stefan, Stevan – Cornish, as in Eglosstefan, Lannstevan
- Stefan, Steven – Breton, as in Sant-Stefan-ar-Roudouz, Gwion Steven
- Ștefan, with the diminutives Ștefănel, Ștefăniță, Ștefănuț – Romanian
- Stefan, Szczepan – Polish
- Stefano – Italian, Esperanto
- Stefans, Stepans, Stepons, Stīvens – Latvian
- Stefanus, Stephanus – Latin
- Stefán – Icelandic
- Steven, Stephen, Stefanus, Stefan – Indonesian
- Staffan, Stefan – Swedish
- Steffan, Stifyn, Stîfyn – Welsh
- Steffen – Norwegian
- Steffen, Stephen, Stefan, Stephan – Danish
- Steffeni, Stefani, Stiifaat – Greenlandic
- Štěpán – Czech
- Steponas, Stepas – Lithuanian
- Stiefnu – Maltese
- Stèaphan, Stìobhan, Stìophan – Scottish Gaelic
- Stjepan, Stijepo, Stepan, Stipan, Stipe, Stipo, Stipa, Šćepan, Šćepo, Štef, Stevko, Stevo, Stefan, Stevan, Stevica – Serbo-Croatian as in Stefan the First-Crowned
- Tapani, Teppo, Tahvo, Teppana,– Finnish
- Têphanô, Stêphanô, Êtiên – Vietnamese
- Tehvan – Estonian
- Tipene – Māori
- Στέφανος (Stephanos, Stefanos, Stephanas, Stepfan, Stephano, Stephanus – Greek
- Степан (Stepan, the most common; Ukrainian), Стефан (Stefan)
- Степан/Stepan, Stepa, Stepka, Stepanya, Stepashka – Russian
- Стефан (Stefan), diminutive: Чефо (Chefo), Стефчо (Stefcho), Стефо (Stefo) – Bulgarian
- Стефан/Stefan, Стеван/Stevan, Стево/Stevo, Стефо/Stefo, Стефче/Stefche – Macedonian
- ⲥⲧⲉⲫⲁⲛⲟⲥ (Step(h)anos), ⲥⲧⲉⲫⲁⲛⲉ (Step(h)ana), ⲥⲉⲧⲉⲡⲫⲉⲛ (Sedephen) – Coptic
- Сцяпан/Sciapan – Belarusian
- Ычтапан/Içtapan – Tatar
- სტეფანე (Stepane) – Georgian
- Ստեփանոս (Stepan), diminutive: Փանոս (Panos) – Armenian
- סטיבן (Stiven), סטפן (Stefan) – Hebrew
- እስጢፋኖስ (Estefanos) – Amharic
- እስቲፋኖስ (Estifanos) – Tigrinya

== People with the name ==
- List of people with given name Stephen
- Stephen (surname), including a list of people with the surname

== Popularity ==
In the United Kingdom, it peaked during the 1950s and 1960s as one of the top ten male first names (ranking third in 1954) but had fallen to twentieth by 1984 and had fallen out of the top one hundred by 2002. The name was ranked 201 in the United States in 2009, according to the Social Security Administration. The name reached its peak popularity in 1951 but remained very common through the mid-1990s, when popularity started to decrease in the United States.

In England and Wales, neither "Stephen" nor "Steven" was among the top 100 names for newborn boys in 2003–2007. In Scotland, "Steven" and "Stephen" were the eighth and tenth most popular names for newborn boys in 1975, but were not in the top ten in 1900, 1950 or 2000. "Stephen" was 68th in 1900, and 46th in 1950, while "Steven" was not in the top 100 either year. Neither spelling was in the top 100 names for newborn boys in Scotland in 2008.

In the United States, the spelling "Stephen" reached its peak of popularity between 1949 and 1951, when it was the 19th most popular name for newborn boys. It stayed in the top 100 boys' names from 1936 through 2000, and for most years between 1897 and 1921. In 2008 it was the 192nd most common name for boys. The spelling "Steven" reached its peak during 1955–1961, when it was the tenth most popular name for newborn boys. It stayed in the top 100 boys' names from 1941 through 2007. In 2008 it was the 104th most popular name for boys. Before the 20th century, the "Steven" spelling was heavily outweighed by "Stephen", never reaching above 391st.
