= Steph =

Steph is often a short form of the feminine given name Stephanie and its other variants, or the masculine given name Stephen.

== Women ==
- Steph Bridge (born 1972), British kitesurfer
- Steph Catley (born 1994), Australian footballer
- Steph Cook (born 1972), Scottish retired pentathlete and 2000 Olympic champion
- Steph Davies (born 1987), Welsh international cricketer
- Steph Davis (born 1973), American rock climber, BASE jumper and wingsuit flyer
- Steph Geremia, Irish-American flute player and singer
- Steph Green, American film and television director
- Stephanie Hanna (born 1982), Canadian curler
- Steph Houghton (born 1988), English footballer
- Steph Key (born 1954), Australian politician
- Stephanie LeDrew (born 1984), Canadian curler
- Steph McGovern (born 1982), British journalist and television presenter
- Stephanie Rice (born 1988), Australian swimmer and three-time Olympic champion
- Steph Ryan (born 1986), Australian politician
- Steph Song (born 1984), Malaysian-born actress
- Steph Swainston (born 1974), British fantasy and science fiction author
- Stephanie Twell (born 1989), British middle- and long-distance runner

== Men ==
- Steph Carse, stage name of Canadian pop singer Stéphane Dostie (born 1966)
- Steph Curry, (born 1988), American basketball player
- Steph Reynolds (born 1993), Welsh rugby union player
- Steph Roberts (born 1985), South African rugby union footballer

== Fictional characters ==
- Steph Cunningham, on the British soap opera Hollyoaks
- Stephanie Scully, on the Australian soap opera Neighbours
- Steph Stokes, on the British soap opera Emmerdale

== See also ==
- Stephanie Pakrul (born 1982), internet personality known as "StephTheGeek"
- Steph., author code for German bryologist Franz Stephani (1842–1927)
