= Teppo =

Teppo may refer to:

- Teppo (name), a Finnish given name and surname
- Teppō, a firearm of Japan
