= Stephane =

Stephane may refer to:

- Stéphane, a French given name
- Stephane (headdress), a vestment in ancient Greece
- Stephane (Paphlagonia), a town of ancient Paphlagonia, now in Turkey
