= Fanus =

Fanus or Fănuș is a name. Notable people with this name include:

- Cory Fanus (born 1996), a Barbadian badminton player
- Fanus Schoeman (born 1945), a South African politician
- Fănuș Neagu (1932–2011), a Romanian writer

== See also ==
- Stefanus (disambiguation)
