= Shtjefën =

Shtjefën is an Albanian masculine given name, a form of Stephen, which means "crown" or "wreath". Notable people with the given name include:

- Shtjefën Gjeçovi (1874–1929), Albanian Catholic priest, ethnologist and folklorist
- Shtjefën Kurti (1898–1971), Albanian Roman Catholic priest

== See also ==
- Shtjefën Gjeçovi Chapel, a cultural heritage monument in Prizren, Kosovo
