= István Nagy =

István Nagy may refer to:

- István Nagy (actor) (1909–1976), Hungarian actor
- István Nagy (athlete) (born 1959), Hungarian sprinter
- István Nagy (footballer, born 1939) (1939–1999), Hungarian footballer
- István Nagy (footballer, born 1986), Hungarian footballer
- István Nagy (painter) (1873–1937), Hungarian painter
- István Nagy (politician, born 1954) (born 1954), Hungarian politician
- István Nagy (politician, born 1967) (born 1967), Hungarian agrarian engineer and politician
