= Tapani (name) =

Finnish male given name

Tapani is a male given name common in Finland equivalent the name of Stephen. As of 2013 there were more than 150,000 people with this name in Finland. A variant of Tapani is Tahvo. The name Teppo is a diminutive of Tapani. It is listed by the Finnish Population Register Centre as one of the top 10 most popular male given names ever.

== Notable people ==
Some people who have this name include:

- Tapani Aartomaa, Finnish graphic designer
- Tapani Haapakoski, Finnish pole vaulter
- Tapani Kalliomäki, Finnish actor
- Tapani Kansa, Finnish singer
- Tapani Niku, Finnish cross-country skier
- Tapani Rinne, Finnish musician
- Tapani Talo, Finnish-American architect and sound technician
- Tapani Tölli, Finnish politician
- Tapani Kalmaru, Welsh archer
