= Steponas =

- Gender: Male

Origin
- Region of origin: Lithuania

Other names
- Related names: Stephen, Steven, Staffan

Steponas (shortened as Stepas) is a Lithuanian masculine given name. It is a cognate of the English language name Stephen, and may refer to:

- Steponas Babrauskas (born 1984), a Lithuanian professional basketball player
- Steponas Darašius (1896–1933), a Lithuanian-born American pilot
- Steponas Kairys (1879–1964), a Lithuanian engineer, nationalist, and social democrat
- Steponas Kazimieraitis (1933–1995), a Lithuanian painter
