= Stefanus =

Stefanus may refer to:

- A variation of the given name Stephen, particularly in regard to:
  - Saint Stephen, first martyr of Christianity
- St. Stefanus, Ghent, a Catholic church in Belgium dedicated to Saint Stephen
- Stefanus Prize, a human rights prize
- Stefanus Alliance International, a religious freedom and human rights organization
- Stefanus Du Toit, a South African inventor

== See also ==
- Stephanus (disambiguation)
