= Diadem =

Ornamental headband worn by monarchs and others as a badge of royalty

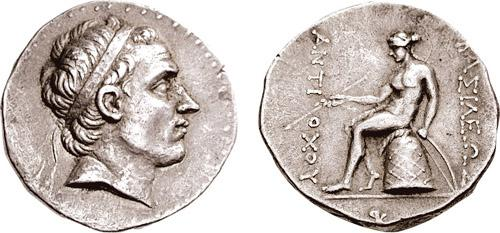
Coin of Antiochus III the Great of the Seleucid Empire, shown wearing a diadem, which was a type of headband tied around the head. Greek inscription reads ΒΑΣΙΛΕΩΣ ΑΝΤΙΟΧΟΥ, "of King Antiochus".

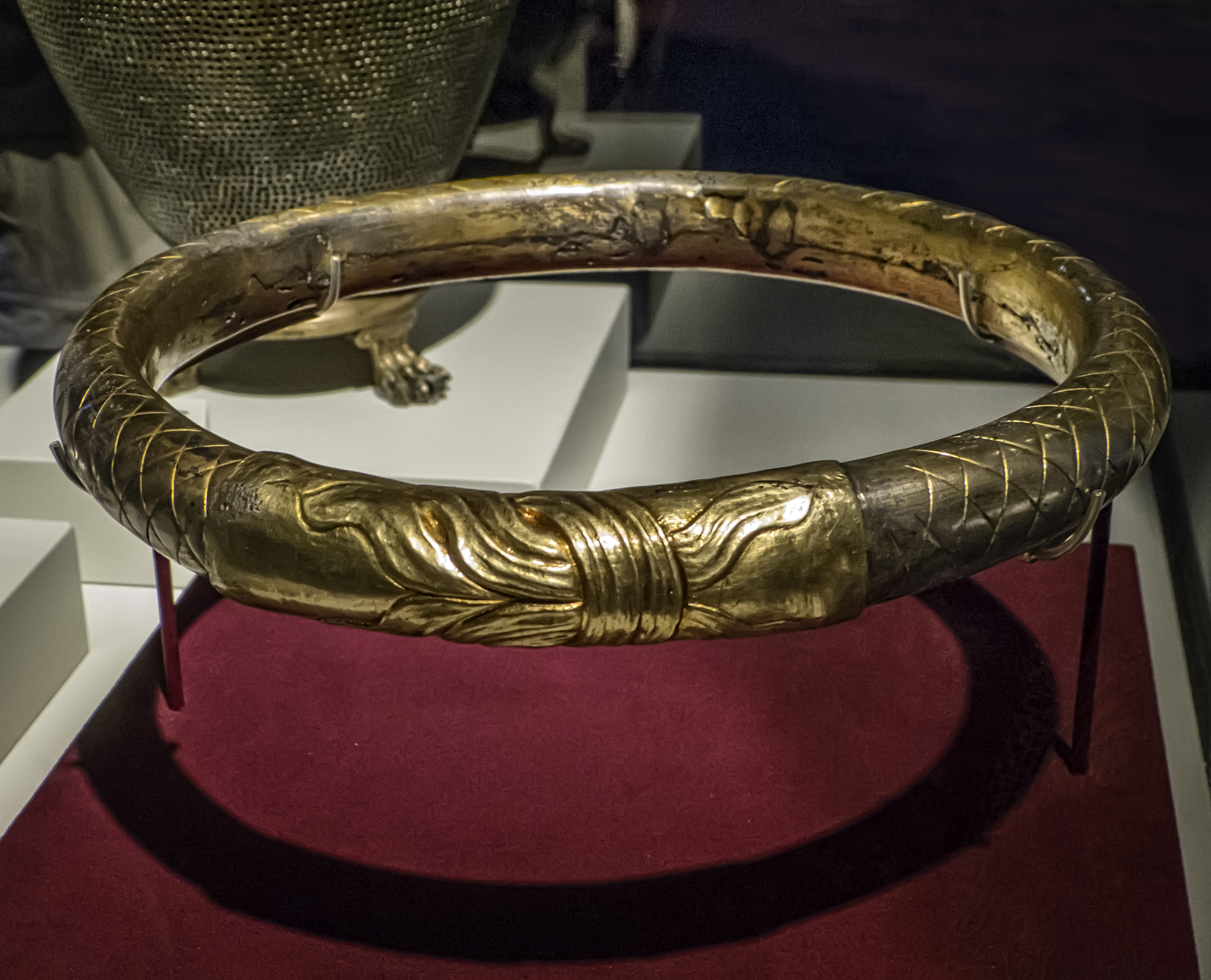
Gold and silver diadem of Philip II of Macedonia. This is one type of diadem used by Macedonian and Hellenistic rulers.

A diadem was an ornamental headband, and later became a metal crown, worn by monarchs and others as a badge of royalty.

== Overview ==
The word derives from the Greek διάδημα diádēma, "band" or "fillet", from διαδέω diadéō, "to bind around" or "to fasten". The term originally referred to the embroidered white silk ribbon, ending in a knot and two fringed strips often draped over the shoulders, that surrounded the head of the king to denote his authority. Such ribbons were also used to crown victorious athletes in important sports games in antiquity. It was later applied to a metal crown, generally in a circular or "fillet" shape. For example, the crown worn by Queen Juliana of the Netherlands was a diadem, as was that of a baron. The ancient Celts were believed to have used a thin, semioval gold plate called a mind (Old Irish) as a diadem. Some of the earliest examples of these types of crowns can be found in ancient Egypt, from the simple fabric type to the more elaborate metallic type, and in the Aegean world. A diadem is also a jewelled ornament in the shape of a half crown, worn by women and placed over the forehead (in this sense, also called tiara). In some societies, it may be a wreath worn around the head. The ancient Persians wore a high and erect royal tiara encircled with a diadem. Hera, queen of the Greek gods, wore a golden crown called the diadem. The Persian, Greek and Macedonian traditions merged in the diadems of Alexander the Great and his successors in the Hellenistic Age. By extension, "diadem" can be used generally for an emblem of regal power or dignity. The Roman emperor's head regalia worn, from the time of Diocletian onwards, is described as a diadem in the original sources. It was this object that the Foederatus general Odoacer returned to Emperor Zeno (the emperor of the Eastern Roman Empire) after his expulsion of the usurper Romulus Augustus from Rome in 476 AD.

== History ==
After the death of Alexander the Great, who used the diadem as part of his royal insignia, the Hellenistic Diadochi kings used the diadem to represent their claim to Alexander's legacy. The diadem was then adopted in Arsacid Parthia, as well as the Sakas and Kushans after their subjugation of Diadochi kingdoms. These Middle Iranic dynasties combined the diadem with other forms of royal headgear such as the Parthian tiara, as the diadem become increasingly common among the kings of small vassal states. Under the Sassanid Persians, diadems grew significantly larger, remaining the most important symbol of kingship. The Romans initially avoided the diadem as it was associated with their negative image of Hellenistic and "Oriental" kings, but later emperors gradually adopted it beginning with Gallienus.

== Gallery ==
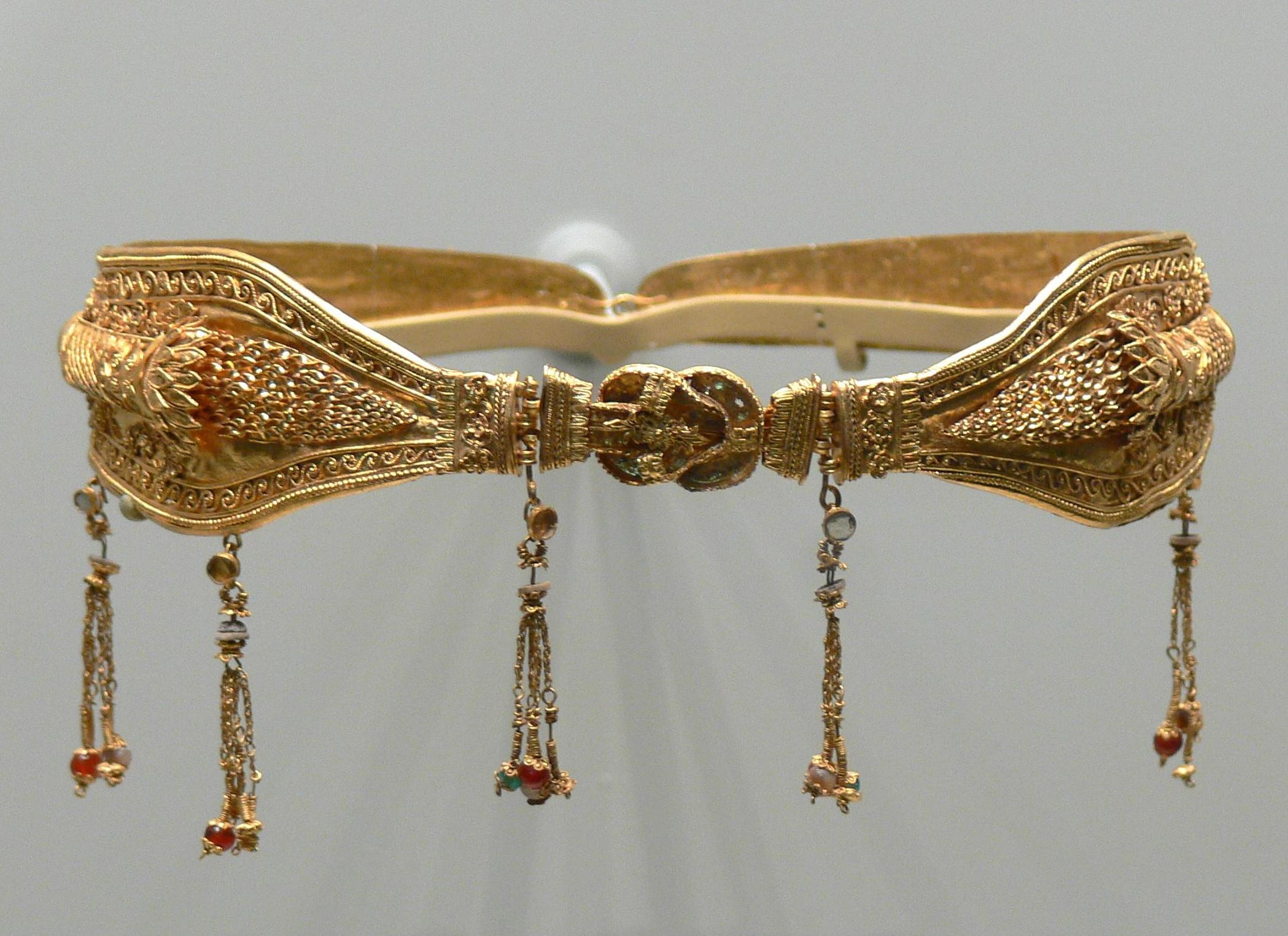
Gold diadem. Greek, probably made in Alexandria, Egypt, and belonging to a noblewoman of the Ptolemaic dynasty (220–100 BC): the clasp is shaped as a Herakles knot

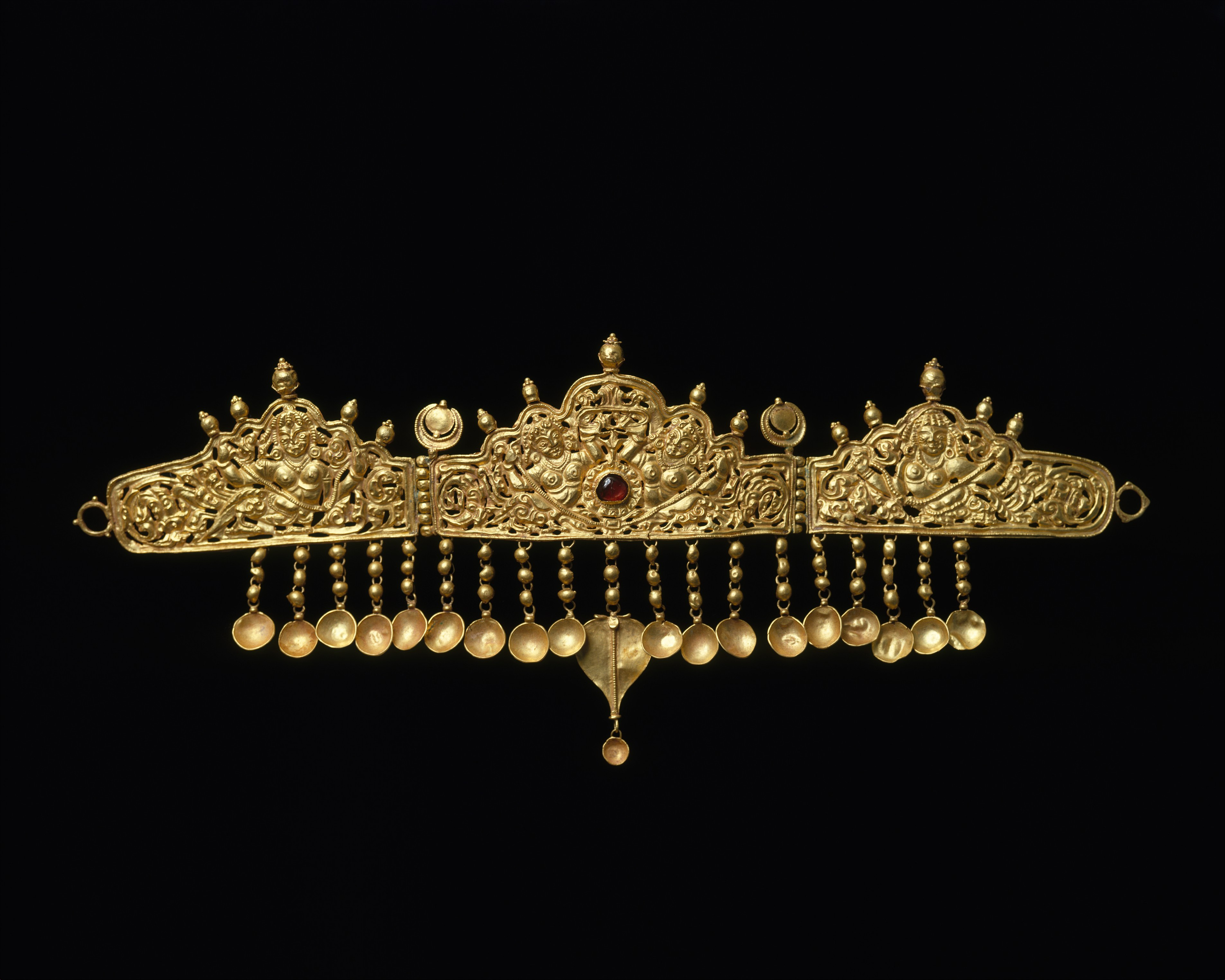
Gold diadem. India, 9th–10th century

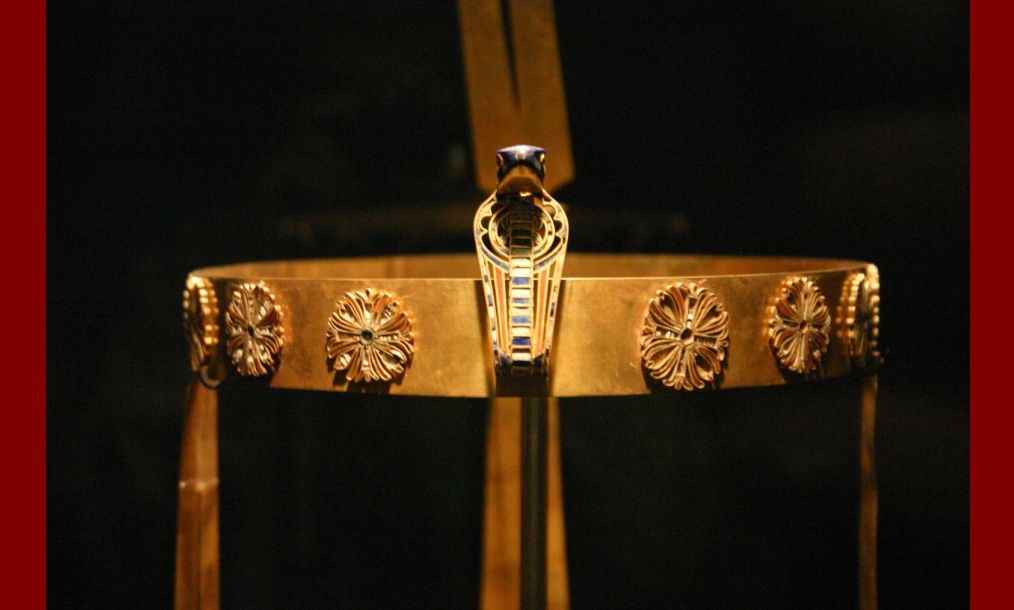
The diadem or crown of Princess Sit-Hathor Yunet from her tomb. 12th Dynasty Egypt 19th century BC.

17th Dynasty diadem crown (Rijksmuseum van Oudheden)

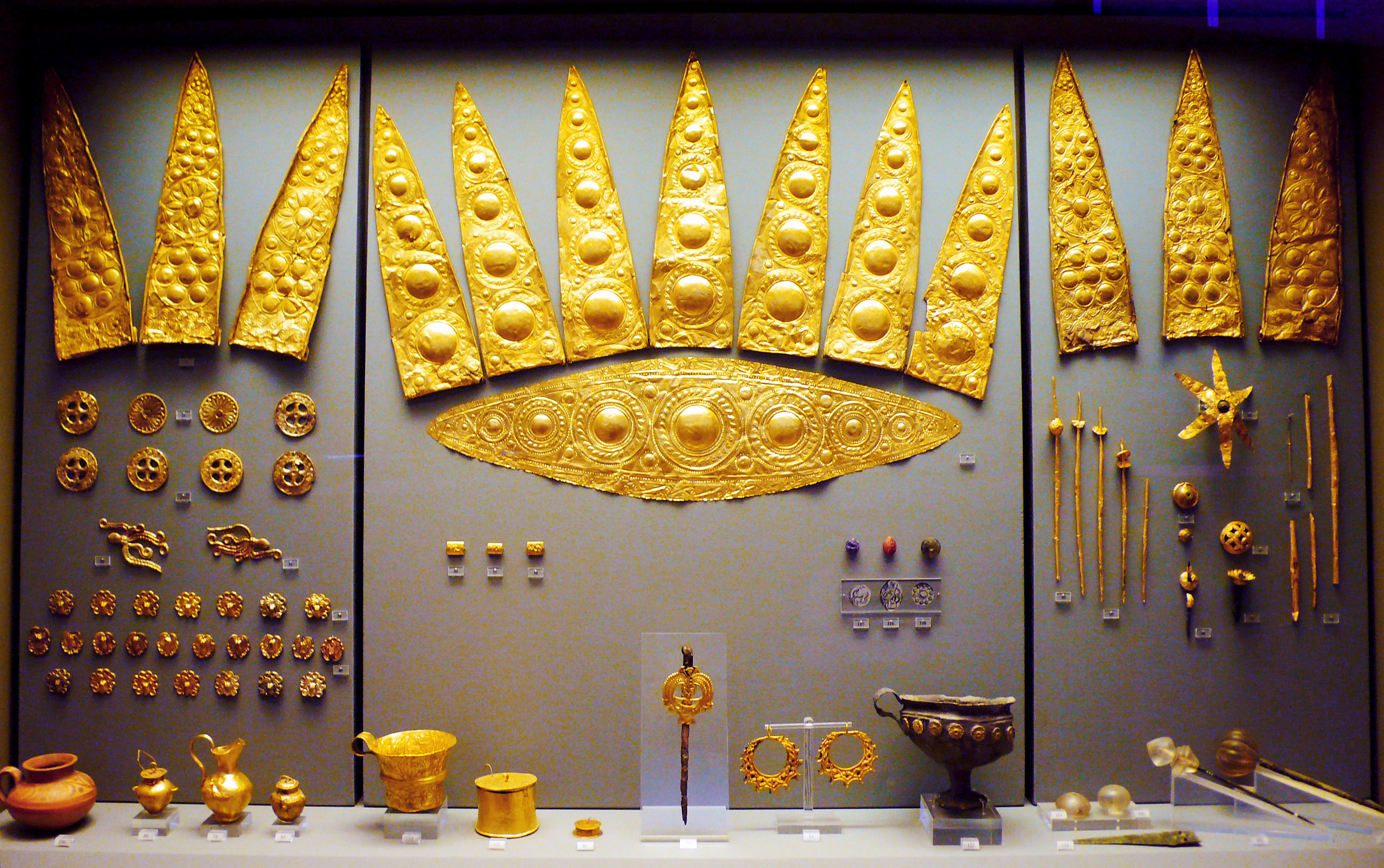
Elliptical diadem from Mycenae, Greece (16th century BC)

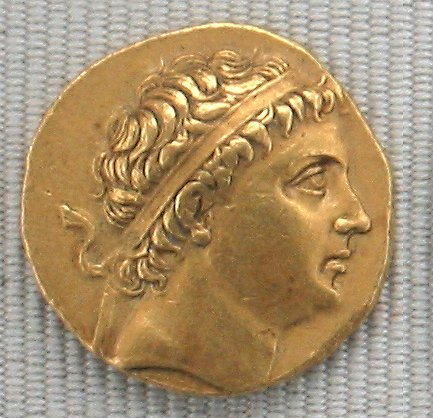
Diodotus of Bactria wearing the diadema, a white ribbon which was the Hellenistic symbol of kingship

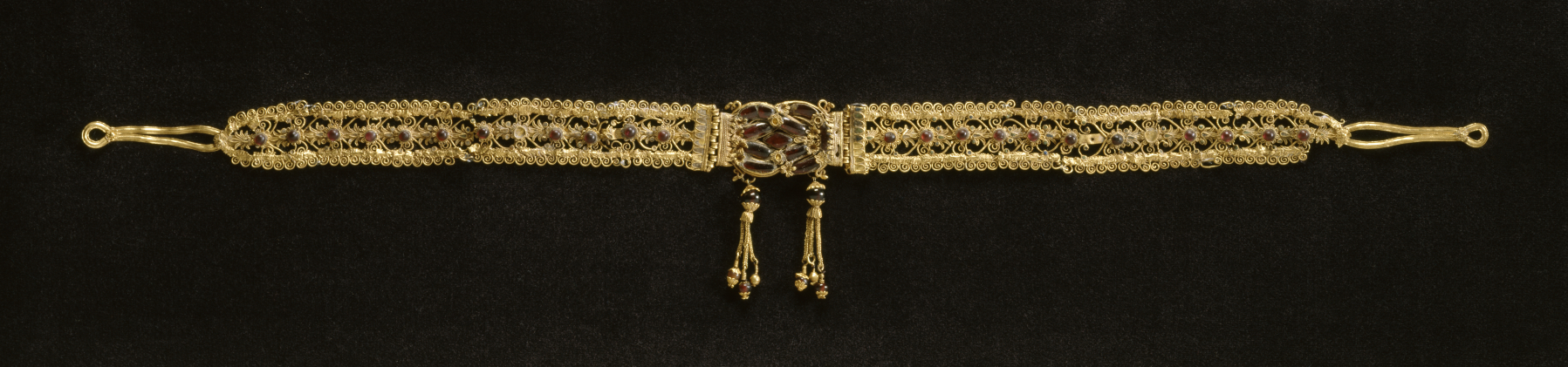
The centerpiece of this Hellenistic diadem is a Herakles knot, known for its apotropaic powers and its status as a symbol of fertility. Walters Art Museum, c. 3rd – 2nd century BC.

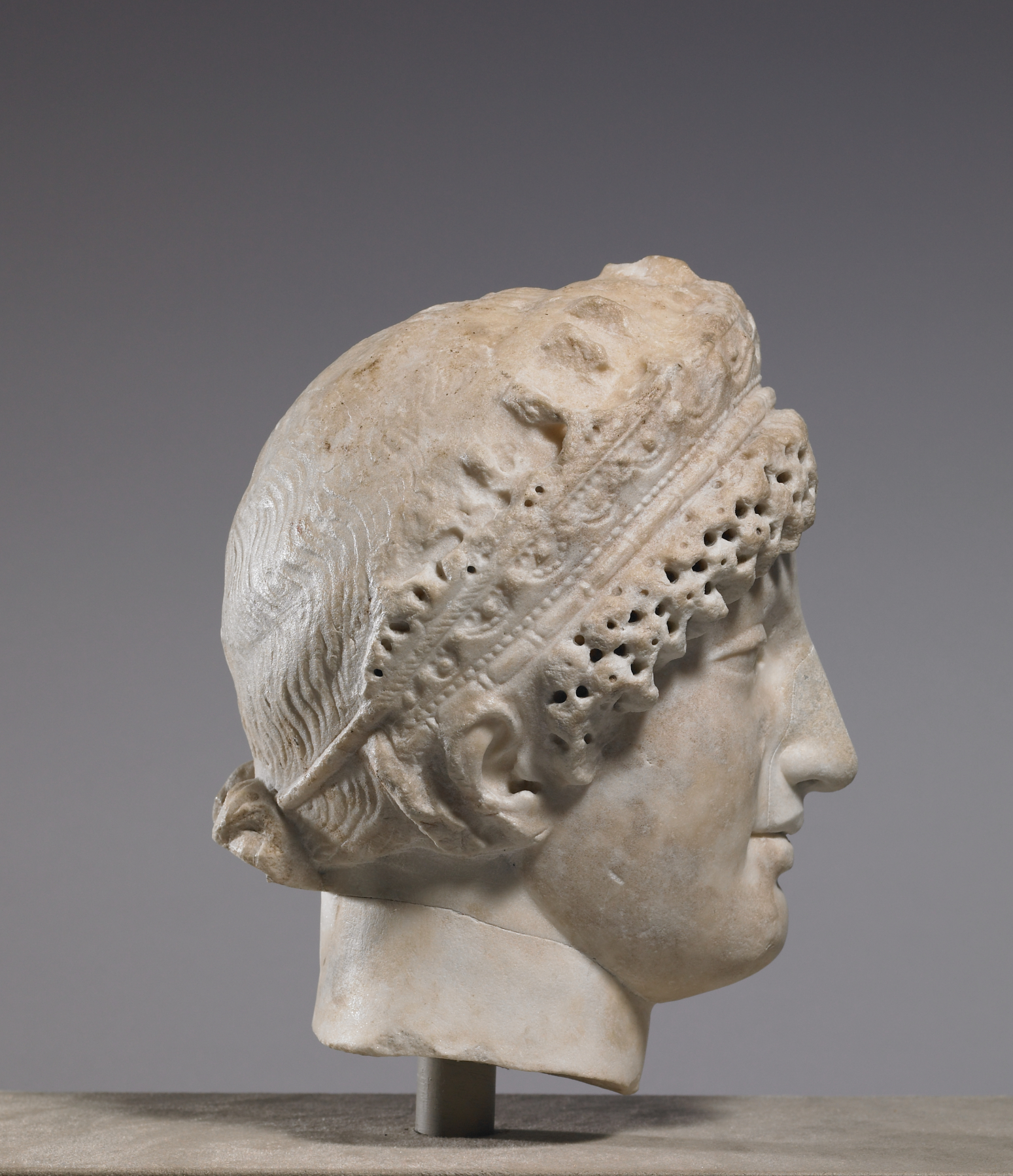
Greco-Roman bust of a woman wearing a diadem (100 BC – 100 AD)

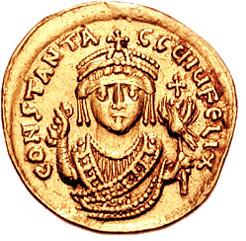
Imperial diadem as worn by Eastern Christian Roman emperors from the 4th century onward

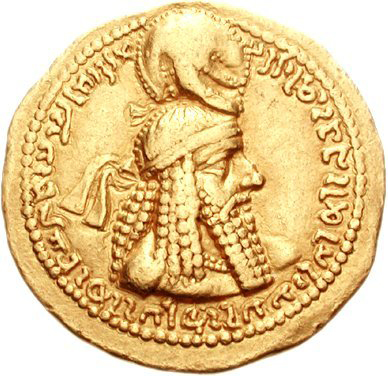
Ardashir I of Sassanian Persia wearing very elaborate diadems

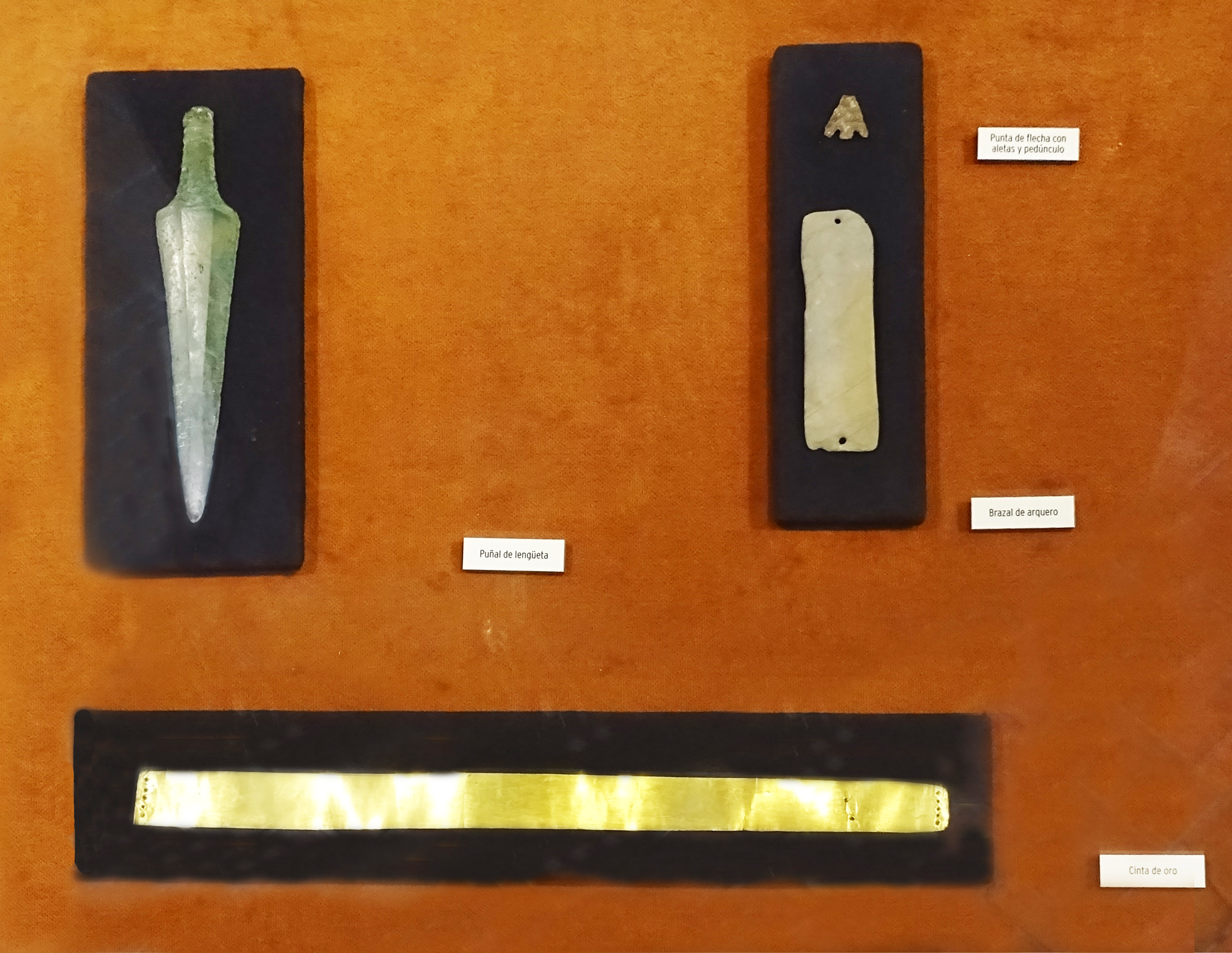
Gold diadem, copper dagger and archery equipment, Bell Beaker culture, Spain, c. 2200 BC

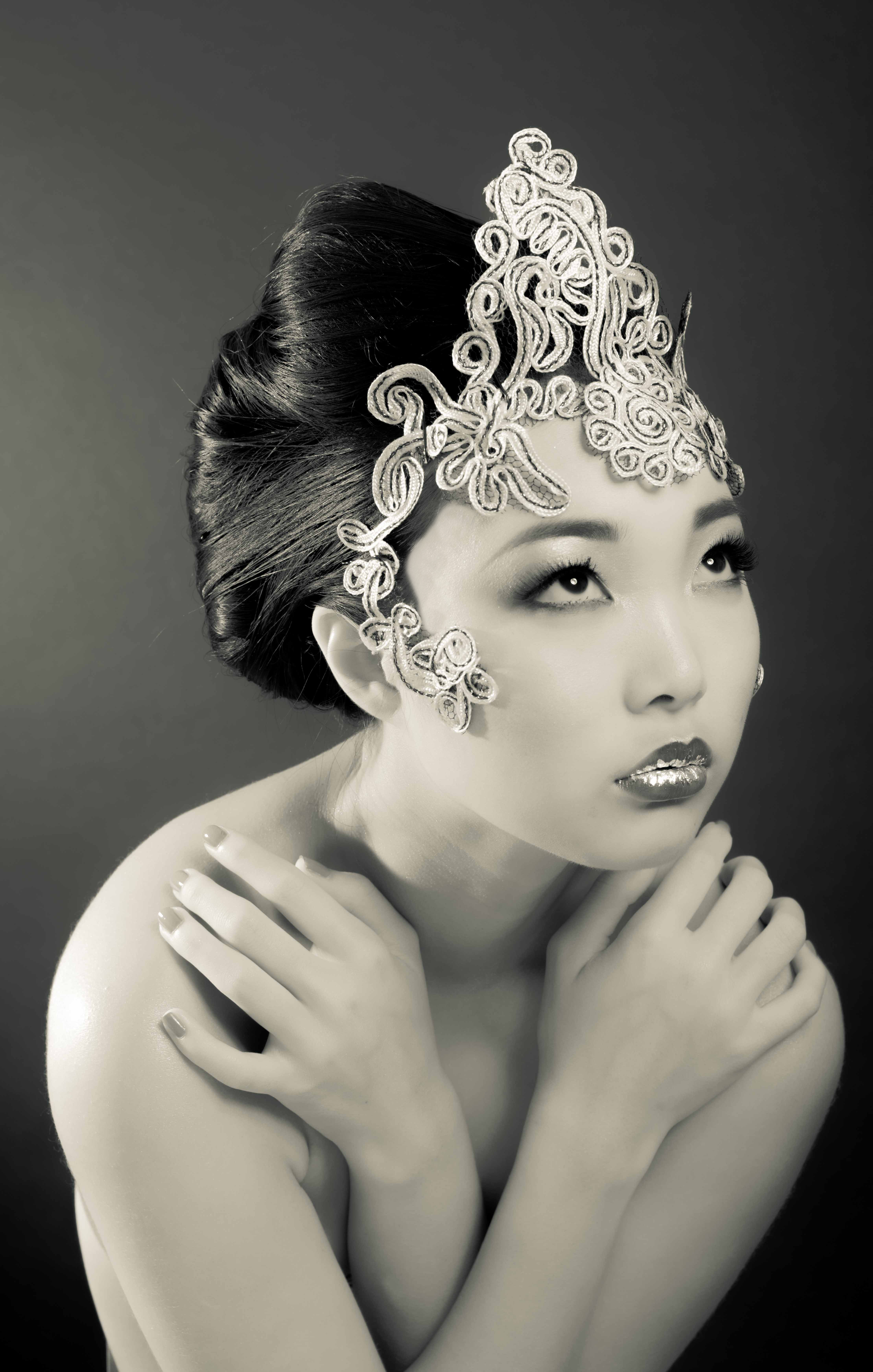
An Argentine woman with a diadem

== See also ==
- Civic crown
- Mural crown
- Stephane (headdress)
