= Stevon =

Stevon is a primarily English-language masculine given name, a variant of Stephen, which means "wreath" or "crown". Notable people with the given name include:

- Stevon Moore (born 1967), American football player
- Stevon Roberts (born 1971), Barbadian sprinter
