= Stijepo =

Stijepo is a Croatian masculine given name, a variant of Stjepan, the Serbo-Croatian form of Stephen, which means "crown" or "wreath". Notable people with the given name include:

- Stijepo Kobasica (1882–1944), Dalmatian and Yugoslav journalist, author and politician
- Stijepo Njire (born 1991), Croatian footballer
- Stijepo Perić (1896–1954), Croatian lawyer, politician and diplomat
