= Staffan =

Staffan is a Swedish form of Stephen, attested since 1330. It may refer to:

- Staffan Anger (born 1943), Swedish politician of the Moderate Party
- Staffan Appelros (born 1950), Swedish politician of the Moderate Party
- Staffan Danielsson (born 1947), Swedish Centre Party politician, member of the Riksdag since 2004
- Staffan de Mistura (born 1947), long-serving Italian-Swedish diplomat
- Staffan Götestam (born 1952), Swedish actor and director
- Staffan Göthe (born 1944), Swedish playwright, actor, and director
- Staffan Kihlbom (born 1962), Swedish actor, who appeared in the 2000 film The Beach
- Staffan Kronwall (born 1983), professional ice hockey defenceman
- Staffan Olsson (born 1964), retired Swedish handball player and Swedish national coach
- Staffan Skott (born 1943), Swedish journalist, author and translator
- Staffan Strand (born 1976), Swedish former high jumper
- Staffan Ström (1934–2016), Swedish physicist
- Staffan Tällberg (born 1970), Swedish former ski jumper
- Staffan Tapper (born 1948), former footballer from Sweden
- Staffan Tunis (born 1982), Finnish ski-orienteering competitor
- Staffan Valdemar Holm (born 1958), Swedish theatre director
- Staffan Söderblom (1900–1985), Swedish diplomat
- Saint Staffan, Swedish 11th-century apostle due to whom the name is associated with Hälsingland

== See also ==
- Staffan Sasses Gränd (Swedish: Alley of Staffan Sasse), a blind alley in Gamla stan, the old town in central Stockholm, Sweden
- Staffa, island off the west coast of Scotland
- Staffin, village on the island of Skye, Scotland
