= Esteban =

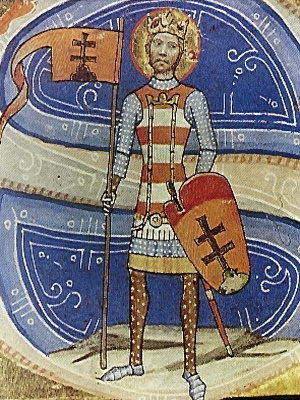

Esteban (pronounced [esˈteβan]) is a Spanish male given name, derived from Greek Στέφανος (Stéphanos) and related to the English names Steven and Stephen. Although in its original pronunciation the accent is on the penultimate syllable, English-speakers tend to pronounce it as a proparoxytone /ˈɛstɪbæn/ EST-ib-an.

== People with the given name ==
- Esteban Alvarado, Costa Rican goalkeeper
- Esteban Andrés Suárez, Spanish football goalkeeper
- Esteban Bellán (1849–1932), Cuban baseball player
- Esteban Cambiasso, Argentine footballer
- Esteban Dorr (born 2000), French table tennis player
- Esteban de Dorantes, 16th Century Explorer of North America
- Esteban de la Fuente, Argentine basketball player
- Esteban Fuertes, Argentine footballer
- Esteban Granero, Spanish footballer
- Esteban Guerrieri, Argentine racing driver
- Esteban Gutiérrez, Mexican racing driver
- Esteban Herrault, French para table tennis player
- Esteban Lazo Hernández, Cuban politician
- Esteban Loaiza, Mexican retired baseball player
- Esteban Navarro, Spanish novelist
- Esteban Ocon, French Formula One driver
- Esteban Pérez, Argentine basketball player
- Esteban Solari, Argentine football player
- Esteban Trapiello, Venezuelan businessman
- Esteban Tuero, Argentine racing driver
- Esteban Valencia, Chilean footballer

== Stage name ==
- Esteban (musician), stage name of guitarist Stephen Paul

== Fictional characters ==
- Esteban, in the French-Japanese animated series The Mysterious Cities of Gold
- Esteban Ramírez, in American television sitcom The Suite Life of Zack & Cody
- Esteban Trueba one of the protagonists of the novel The House of the Spirits by Isabel Allende
- Steve "Esteban" Cortez, shuttle pilot and requisitions officer in the video game Mass Effect 3.
