= Étienne Doirat =

- Born: c. 1675
- Died: 1732
- Occupation: Furniture designer
- Spouse: Marguerite Borel
- Children: 7

Étienne Doirat (c. 1675-1732) was a French furniture designer.

== Early life ==
Étienne Doirat was born circa 1675. His family had been ébénistes in Paris since the early 1600s.

== Career ==
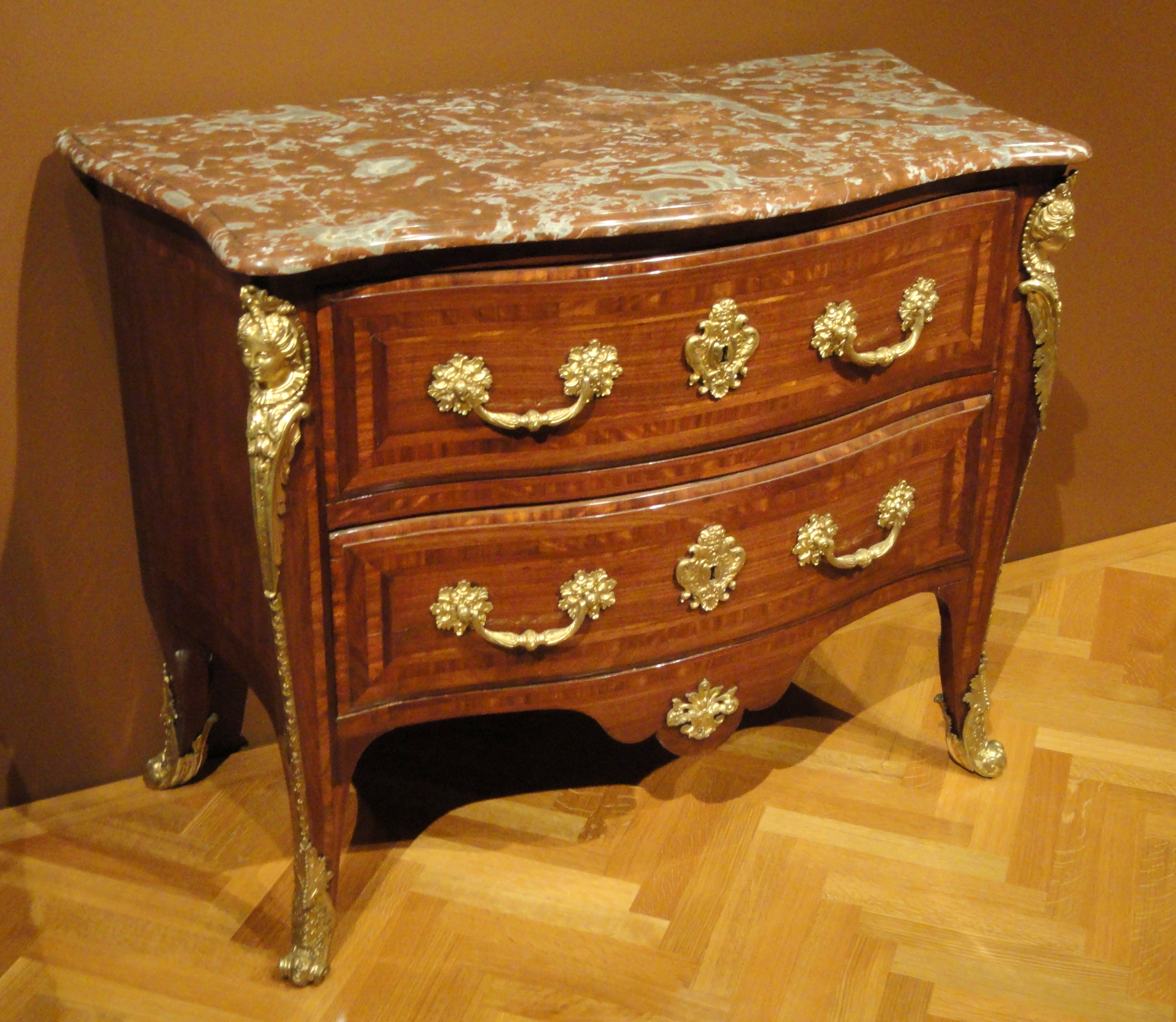
Commode circa 1725, attributed to Etienne Doirat, Paris, kingwood with gilt metal and marble. Cleveland Museum of Art.

Doirat designed "commodes, armoires, corner cupboards, and tables" as well as sideboards, writing desks, etc. He used exotic wood like amaranth, mahogany, olivetree wood, lemontree wood, rosewood, ebony, etc.

Doirat stamped his name to his furniture at a time when it was not the proper way. Indeed, furniture design guilds only allowed it was late as 1743.

In 1731, only one year before his death, he opened a store on the Rue Saint-Honoré in the 1st arrondissement of Paris.

One of his commodes can be seen at the J. Paul Getty Museum in Los Angeles, California.

== Personal life ==
He married Marguerite Borel in 1704. They had seven children.

== Death ==
He died in 1732.
