= Guy Étienne =

Lexicographer on the Breton language

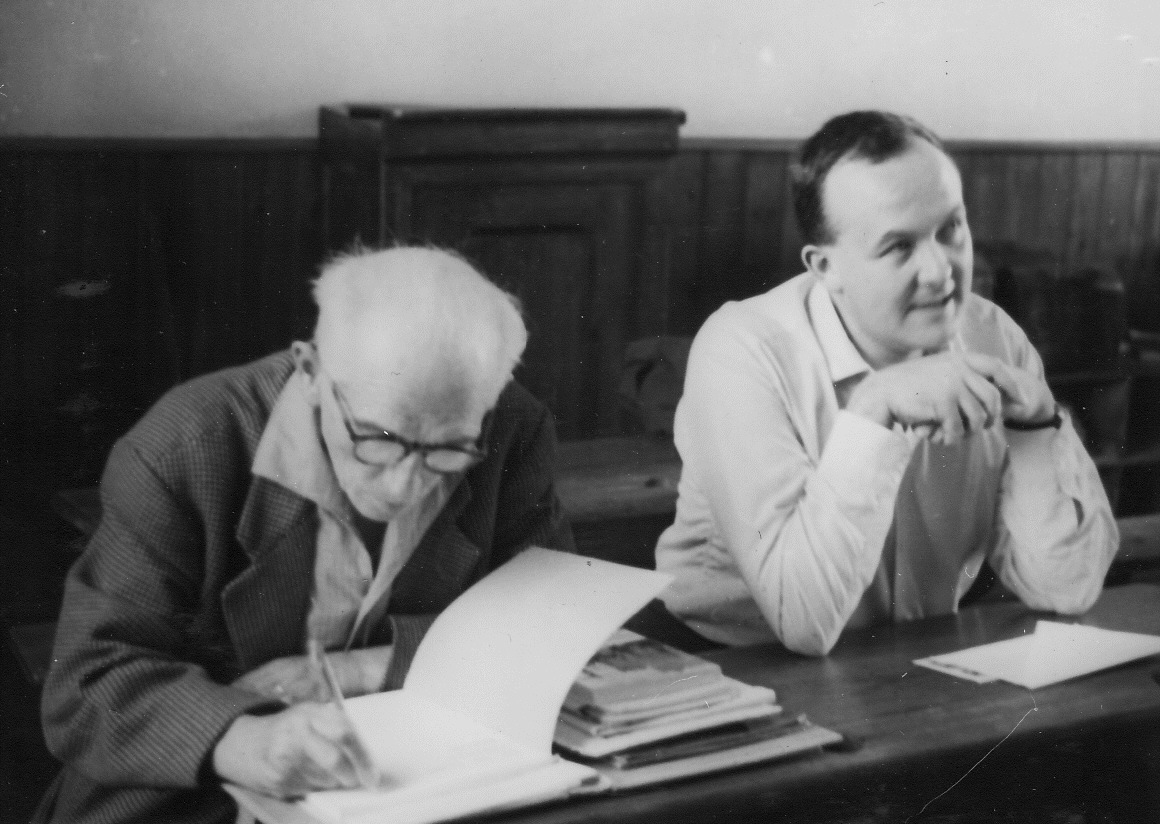
Guy Etienne on the right, with Abeozen (François Eliès) in 1959

Guy Étienne (Gwion Steven in Breton) or Abanna (born 18 September 1928 in Saint-Carreuc, died 6 January 2015 in Châteaulin) was a writer and lexicographer who was known for having created the Emsav magazine and the publishing house Preder. He wrote a lot of articles and dictionaries on the Breton language. He was the leader of the scientific magazine named Lavar which was managed by linguists seeking to create new Breton words adapted to specific fields such as psychoanalysis, medicine or computer science.

== His work ==
First he wrote poems for the magazine Al Liamm since 1953, for example Eil pedenn evit gorreoù Nedeleg or Trec'h ar barzh. He translated articles from other languages too.

In 1959 he worked for the political magazine Ar Vro, with Pêr Denez and Ronan Pennek.

In 1960 he started to write articles on the history and destiny of the movement Emsav as in Eus an Emsav d'an emframm, Ur gefridi bolitikel : diorren ar yezh resis, Eil tezenn vrezhonek ar c'hantved, Lennegezh ha Dispac'h, Ar paradozioù kollet or Preder e 1970. And he was increasingly interested in creating words and developing language which became his favorite field of work from the 1990s.

=== The lexicographer ===
Some exchanges of letters between Guy Étienne and Roparz Hemon about the construction of neologisms were published in the magazine "Preder" between 1957 and 1977. From these exchanges, Guy Étienne decided to create a magazine called Lavar where all the correspondence he had with Roparz Hemon, Goulven Pennaod, Yann-Baol an Noalleg, Martial Ménard, and Yann-Varc'h Thorel about the proposed neologisms.

As he wrote literary, political or linguistic articles, and became a specialist in creating new words after having abandoned politics when his magazine Emsav closed in 1978. Since 1979 he devoted himself, with Goulwenn Penaod, entirely to linguistics through the Preder editions.

The new words created were most often constructed from Celtic roots found in Old Breton, Welsh or Cornish and avoided words of Latin or international origin.

== Works ==
=== Poems ===
- Diazerc'h, Barzhonegoù ha skridoù all / ÉTIENNE Gi-ABANNA. - Preder, 1975. - 61 p.
- Krennlavaroù nevez an ifern, Preder, 2005. - 189 p.
- La Pierre du Oui / Maen ar Ya, barzhoniezh, divyezhek galleg-brezhoneg, / ÉTIENNE Gi-ABANNA; AR BERR Alan-E.- Éditions de la Différence, 1989. - 221 p.

=== Dictionaries ===
- Geriadur a gorfadurezh, rann 1, 1960, Preder.
- Geriadur a gorfadurezh, rann 2, 1961, Preder.
- Geriadur a gorfadurezh, rann 3, 1963, Preder.
- Geriadur ar Mediaoù, (Dictionnaire du cinéma et de la vidéo) gant Pascal Le Moal, 2000, Preder.
- Geriadur ar Stlenneg (Dictionnaire de l'informatique en trois langues : français, anglais, breton), 1995, Preder.
- Geriadur ar Bredelfennerezh e peder yezh : Galleg, alamaneg, Saozneg, Brezhoneg ( dictionnaire de Psychanalyse en quatre langues : Français, Allemand, anglais, Breton), Preder, 1983
- Geriadur ar Gorfadurezh (Dictionnaire de l'anatomie conforme à la nomenclature internationale PNA en français, latin et breton), 1999, Preder.
- Geriadur ar Vezekniezh, Rann 1, A - Auscultation, Galleg-Saozneg-Brezhoneg, Preder, 2007. - pp. 1–160.
- Geriadur ar Vezekniezh, Rann 2, Auscultation - Chaîne, Galleg-Saozneg-Brezhoneg, Preder, 2008. - pp. 161–320.
- Geriadur ar Vezekniezh, Rann 3, Chaîne - Déplétion, Galleg-Saozneg-Brezhoneg, Preder, 2009. - pp. 321–480.
- Geriadur ar Vezekniezh, Rann 4, Dépôt - Expressivité, Galleg-Saozneg-Brezhoneg, Preder, 2010. pp. 481–640.
- Geriadur ar Vezekniezh, Rann 5, Exsanguination - Homosexuel, Galleg-Saozneg-Brezhoneg, Preder, 2011. - pp. 641–800.
- Geriadur ar Vezekniezh, Rann 6, Homozygote - Lagophtalmie, Galleg-Saozneg-Brezhoneg, Preder, 2012. - pp. 801–960.
- Geriadur ar Vezekniezh, Rann 7, Lait - Miliaire, Galleg-Saozneg-Brezhoneg, Preder, 2013. - pp. 961–1120.
- Geriadur ar Vezekniezh, Rann 8, Miliaire - Ostéite, Galleg-Saozneg-Brezhoneg, Preder, 2014. - pp. 1121–1280.
- Geriadur ar Vezekniezh, Rann 9, Ostéoarthrite - Polyvalent, Galleg-Saozneg-Brezhoneg, Preder, 2015. - pp. 1281–1440.
- Geriadur ar Vezekniezh, Rann 10, Polyviscéral - Récepteur, Galleg-Saozneg-Brezhoneg, Preder, 2017. - pp. 1441–1600. (with Yann-Baol an Noalleg)
- Geriadur ar Vezekniezh, Rann 11, Récepteur - Spectrine, Galleg-Saozneg-Brezhoneg, Preder, 2020. - pp. 1601–1760. (with Yann-Baol an Noalleg)
- Geriadur ar Vezekniezh, Rann 12, Spectographie - Tuberculine, Galleg-Saozneg-Brezhoneg, Preder, 2021. - pp. 1761–1920. (with Yann-Baol an Noalleg)
- Geriadur ar Vezekniezh, Rann 13, Tuberculisation - Zymotique, Galleg-Saozneg-Brezhoneg, Preder, 2022. - pp. 1921–2050. (with Yann-Baol an Noalleg)

=== Studies ===
- Un Hent hag un dremmwel- Tonkad Harki / Yann Mikael
- Ar gwez el latar / Joëlle Kermoal;
- Ha brav e oa ar skolveur / Joëlle Kermoal;
- Ur sizhunvezh dispac'h / Yann Mikael;
- Roazhon bepred / Pierrette Kermoal;
- Pa save al loar / Pierrette Kermoal;
- Ar pezh a chom / Joëlle Kermoal;
- Kimiad d'ur c'hi / Yann Mikael. / KERMOAL Joëlle; KERMOAL Pierrette; MIKAEL Yann; ETIENNE Gi-ABANNA (Préface de). - Preder, 1971. - 126 p.
