= István Árkossy =

Hungarian painter and graphic artist

István Árkossy (born 1943) is a Hungarian painter and graphic artist. He is a member of the Association of Hungarian Creative Artists, the Federation of Hungarian Fine and Applied Arts Societies and the Association of Hungarian Graphic Artists.

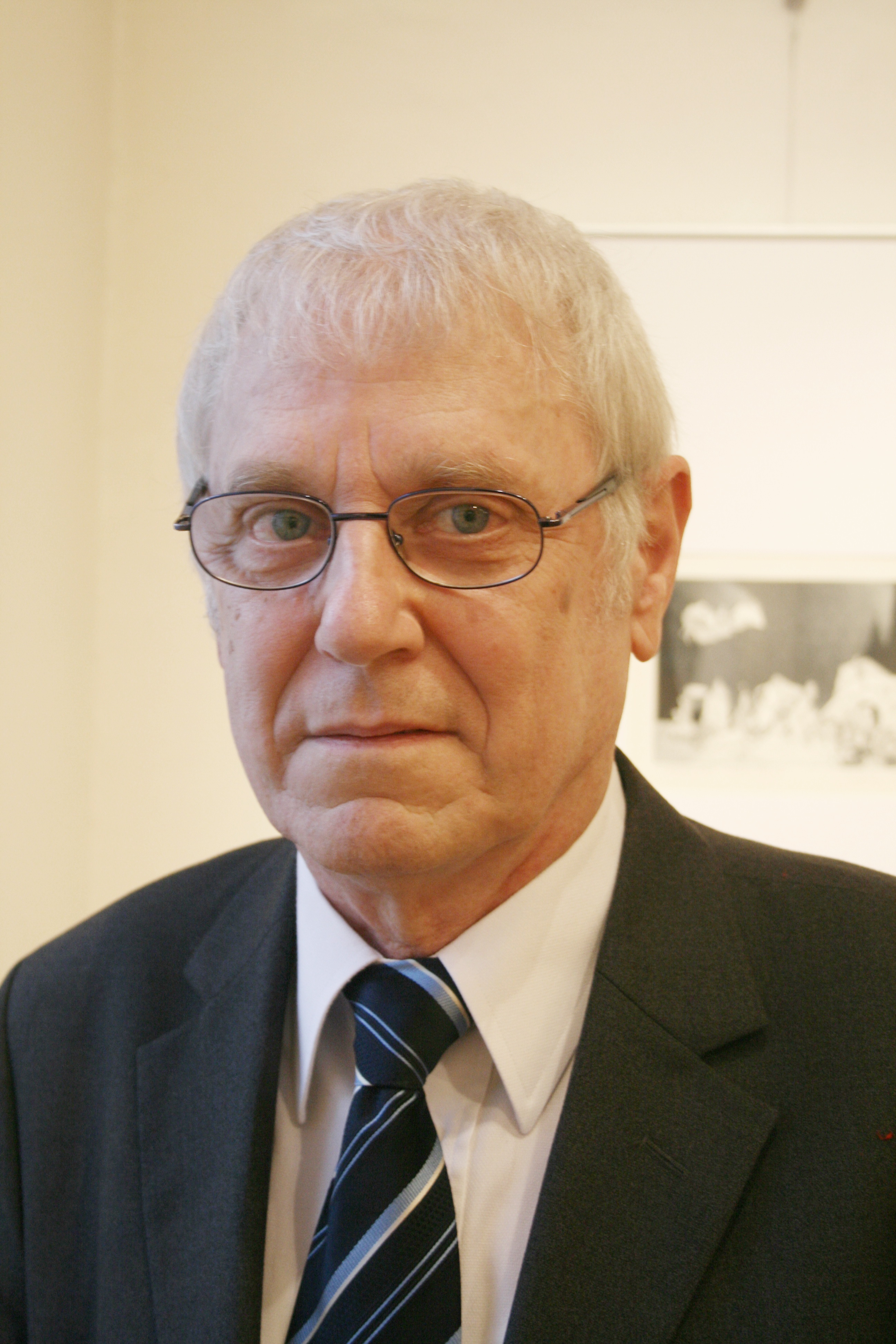
Árkossy in 2013

== Biography ==
Árkossy was born in Kolozsvár (present-day Cluj-Napoca, Romania), in what was at the time part of Hungary (due to the Second Vienna Award); he graduated from the University of Fine Arts there in 1966. He currently resides in Budapest.

== Individual exhibitions ==
- 1972, 1976, 1982 Klausenburg
- 1984 Young Artists Club Budapest
- 1988 Gutenberg Gallery Budapest
- 1988 Medgyessy Saloon Debrecen
- 1989 Dürer Saloon Budapest
- 1989 Art Exhibition Center Stuttgart Germany
- 1989 Geretsried Germany
- 1989 Frankfurt am Main Germany
- 1992 Asemwald Stuttgart Germany
- 1993 Csók Gallery Budapest
- 2003 Korunk Gallery Klausenburg
- 2004 Vármegye Gallery Budapest

== Foreign collective exhibitions ==
- 1986 Titograd Yugoslavia
- 1978 Joan Miró International Drawing Contest Barcelona Spain
- 1979 Small Graphic Biennale Łódź Poland
- 1980 Ex Libris Exhibition Linz Austria
- 1981 Sint Niklaas Belgium
- 1982 Small Graphic Exhibition Athens Greece
- 1983 Collective Migrant Exhibition USA
- 1983 Graphic Biennale Ljubljana Yugoslavia
- 1986 Graphic Exhibition New York City USA
- 1988 Tampere Finland
- 1988 Antwerp Belgium
- 1990 Ex Libris Biennale Malbork Poland
- 1990 Mönchengladbach Germany
- 1991 Graphic Biennale Łódź Poland
- 1992 Exhibition of Artists of Budapest Munich Germany
- 1993 Glinde Germany.

== Exhibitions in Hungary ==
- 1987, 1989, 1991, 2000 National Graphic Biennale Miskolc
- 1988, 1990, 1992, 1998, 2000, 2002 National Drawing Biennale Salgótarján
- 1991 Árkád Gallery Budapest
- 1992, 2002, 2004 National Small Graphic Biennale Újpest Budapest
- 1992 Exhibition of Graphic Studios Csók Gallery Budapest
- 1999 XXXI.-, 2003 XXXIII. – Alföld Art Exhibition Békéscsaba
- 2000 Art Kortárs Gallery and Foundation of Hungarian Graphics: Selected small graphics Budapest
- 2000, 2002 National Pastel Biennale Esztergom
- 2001 Foundation of National Culture hall Budapest
- 2002 Ernst Museum Budapest.
