= Stéphane Dimy =

Ivorian footballer

Personal information
- Full name: Stéphane Landry Dimy
- Date of birth: November 12, 1980 (age 45)
- Place of birth: Abidjan, Ivory Coast
- Height: 1.84 m (6 ft 0 in)
- Position: Goalkeeper

Team information
- Current team: Africa Sports National
- Number: 16

Youth career
- –2003: ASEC Mimosas

Senior career*
Years	Team	Apps	(Gls)
2003–2006	ASEC Mimosas		
2006–2008	EFYM		
2008–	Africa Sports National		
- * Club domestic league appearances and goals as of 10:57, 22 May 2008 (UTC) ‡ National team caps and goals as of 10:57, 22 January 2008 (UTC)

Stéphane Landry Dimy (born 12 November 1980) is an Ivorian footballer who played as a goalkeeper for Africa Sports National.

== Career ==
He was signed on 1 July 2008 by Africa Sports National and was transferred from EFYM (Ecole de Football Yéo Martial), formerly between January 2006 was member from ASEC Mimosas.

Dimy played for ASEC Mimosas in the 2003 CAF Champions League group stages, scoring an own goal in the match away to Ismaily.
