= Shtjefën Gjeçovi Chapel =

Cultural heritage monument of Kosovo

- Kapela e at Shtjefën Gjeqovit (Albanian)
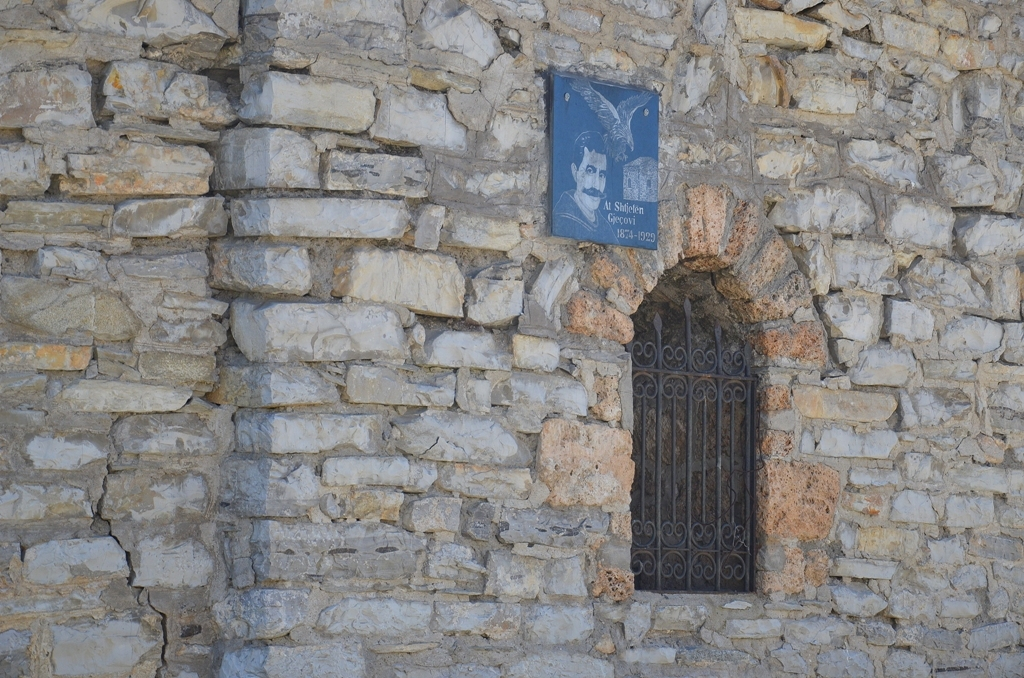
- Location: Karashëngjergj, Prizren, Kosovo

History
- Built: 1960s

The Shtjefën Gjeçovi Chapel is a cultural heritage monument in Karashëngjergj, Prizren, Kosovo.

Shtjefën Gjeçovi was born in 1874 in Janjevo, attending Franciscan school in Shkodër and continuing his education in Derven (now in North Macedonia), Finiq, and Banja Luka. He was a noted folklorist and Albanologist. He was killed in 1929 in Zym, Prizren, and is buried in the Karashëngjergj cemetery. In 1935, his edition of the Kanun of Lekë Dukagjini, a traditional code of law, was published posthumously in Shkodër. The eponymous chapel was built in the cemetery in the 1960s by the Kosovo Office for the Protection of Monuments. Small and rectangular, the chapel has a northern apse with a semicircular base and a matching wooden semicircular door facing south. The building is stone with lime mortar, plastered on the inside but out. The southern façade includes a stone Latin cross and a metal plaque with the birth and death dates of Father Gjeçovi. The roof is covered in stone slabs two deep, except for the three-layer portion over the apse.
