= Stephanus =

Stephanus is a masculine given name, the Latin equivalent of Stephen. It occasionally occurs as a surname, or as a Latin rendering of a surname (as in the case of the Estienne family of French printers and scholars).

Notable people with the name include:

- Stephanus of Alexandria, 7th-century Greek philosopher, astronomer and teacher
- Stephanus of Athens, 6th to 7th-century Greek physician
- Stephanus of Byzantium, 6th-century Greek grammarian and geographer
- Stephanus Ackermann (born 1985), Namibian cricketer
- Étienne Baluze (1630–1718), Stephanus Baluzius in Latin, French scholar
- Stephanus Biermann (1918–2003), South African rear admiral
- Stef Blok (born 1964), Dutch politician
- Stephanus Brodericus (c. 1480–1539), Croatian–Hungarian bishop, diplomat and humanist writer
- Stephan Coetzee (born 1992), South African rugby union player
- Stephanus Jacobus du Toit (1847–1911), South African nationalist
- Charles Estienne (1504–1564), Carolus Stephanus in Latin, French anatomist
- Henri Estienne (elder) (1470–1520), Henricus Stephanus in Latin, French printer, father of Robert and Charles Estienne
- Henri Estienne (1528 or 1531–1598), Henricus Stephanus in Latin, French printer and classical scholar, son of Robert Estienne
  - Stephanus pagination of Plato and Plutarch, introduced by the younger Henri Estienne
- Robert Estienne (1503–1559), Robertus Stephanus in Latin, French printer and classical scholar
- Stephanus Grobler (born 1982), South African cricketer
- Stephanus Paul Kruger (1825–1904), South African political and military figure, President of the South African Republic
- Stephanus Lombaard, South African Paralympic athlete
- Stephanus Petrus le Roux (1891–1974), South African politician
- Stephanus Le Roux Marais (1896–1979), South African composer
- Stephan Myburgh (born 1984), Dutch cricketer
- Fanie du Plessis (1930–2001), South African discus thrower and shot putter
- Stephanus Schoeman (1810–1890), South African politician
- Willy Stephanus (born 1991), Namibian footballer
- Étienne Tempier (died 1279), also known as Stephanus of Orleans, French bishop
- Stephanus Van Cortlandt (1643–1700), Mayor of New York City
- Stephanus Versluys (1694–1736), governor of Dutch Ceylon

== See also ==
- Stephen
- Stefanus (disambiguation)
