= Ettienne Richardson =

Grenadian footballer (born 1981)

Ettienne Richardson (born April 23, 1981) is a Grenadian football player. He played as a striker for the Grenada national football team. Between 2005 and 2012, he appeared in 6 international matches for Grenada, after his debut against Barbados.
