= Estifanos =

Estifanos is a name. Notable people with the name include:

- Estifanos Seyoum (born 1947), Eritrean politician
- Abba Estifanos of Gwendagwende, Ethiopian monk
- Dawit Estifanos (born 1988), Ethiopian footballer
- Mereb Estifanos (born 1983), Eritrean actress
- Tewelde Estifanos (born 1981), Eritrean long-distance runner
