= Stephanie Pakrul =

Canadian internet personality

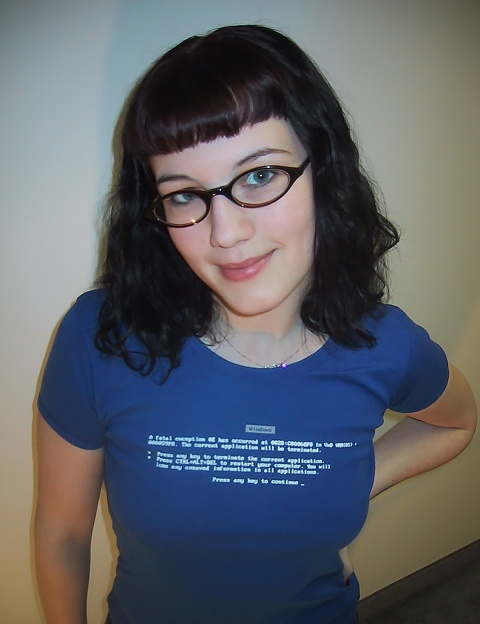
Pakrul in a Blue Screen of Death T-shirt (2004)

Stephanie Pakrul (born September 9, 1982), also known as StephTheGeek, is an internet personality.

== Biography ==
Pakrul is from Mississauga, Ontario. She studied as an information technology student at Ryerson University in Toronto and earned a master's degree from the University of California, Berkeley.

Pakrul began developing webpages at around the age of 15 and started her personal site a few years later, in 2001, as a small personal website. The site has since become a blog, sharing many personal details of her life, including music, relationships, gadgetry, and sexuality.

Her third year of college, she posed nude for the 2002 Love & Sex issue of Eyeopener's, a Ryerson University student newspaper.

Having started her webcam shortly after her personal site, Parkul was involved in early Camgirl culture and was featured in CamGirls (2005), a documentary on her experiences with the still developing media form. One such webcam was a 24/7 stream using a network camera, about which she spoke in a presentation entitled "Show Me Your Boobs!'"and Other Subtleties of Building a Highly Interactive Personal Community as a featured speaker at NotACon 2005.

In 2003, Pakrul self-published a musical album, Not a Victim, which was partially crowdfunded through donations on her website. Feminist blog The F-Word praised Not a Victim, writing: "Beautifully crafted songs with wonderful melodies, emotional lyrics and understated piano/guitar accompaniment make this a stand-out debut."

In 2004, she scripted and published the first cellphone based webcam which she titled Perpetua(l).

Pakrul has been featured on TechTV, Canadian Broadcasting Corporation's Street Cents, MTV Live, and in Young Entrepreneur, Cosmogirl, and several newspapers. Her interests include consumer rights, sex work, and increasing efficiency in everyday life through innovative uses of technology. She was also a member of Industry Canada's SchoolNet Youth Advisory Board.

As of 2016, Pakrul lives in San Francisco.

== See also ==
- Geek chic
