= Étienne Compayré =

French politician

- Born: 23 October 1748; Lisle-sur-Tarn, Tarn, Midi-Pyrénées, France
- Died: 22 November 1817 (aged 69); Lisle-sur-Tarn, Tarn, Midi-Pyrénées, France
- Occupation: Politician

Étienne Compayré (1748-1817) was a French politician.

== Early life ==
Étienne Compayré was born on 23 October 1748 in Lisle-sur-Tarn, France.

== Career ==
Compayré was a justice of the peace. He served in the Council of Five Hundred during the French Directory, followed by the Corps législatif during the French Consulate (later National Assembly) from 1798 to 1803, representing Tarn. He was a proponent of the Coup of 18 Brumaire, which brought General Napoleon Bonaparte to power as First Consul of France.

== Death and legacy ==
Compayré died on 22 November 1817 in his hometown of Lisle-sur-Tarn. The Rue Etienne Compayré in Lisle-sur-Tarn was named in his honor.
