= István Varga (politician, born 1953) =

Hungarian politician

Member of the National Assembly
- In office 14 May 2010 – 5 May 2014
- In office 28 June 1994 – 14 May 2002

Personal details
- Born: 18 October 1953 (age 72) Orosháza, Hungary
- Party: MDF (1988–2002); Fidesz (since 2002)
- Profession: jurist, politician

István Varga (born 18 October 1953) is a Hungarian lawyer and politician, a member of the National Assembly (MP) from 1994 to 2002, and from 2010 to 2014.

== Political career ==
He joined Hungarian Democratic Forum (MDF) in 1988, and served as President of the party's Békés County branch between 1992 and 2002. He was a local representative in the Assembly of Orosháza from 1990 to 1994, and functioned as head of the MDF group. He was elected MP from the party's Békés County Regional List in the 1994 parliamentary election. He became a member of the Committee on Environmental Protection (1994–1995), and the Committee on Immunity, Incompatibility, and Mandate (1994–2002). He was delegated to the Presidium of the Hungarian Democratic Forum in 1996. He was elected MP for Orosháza (Békés County Constituency VI) during the 1998 parliamentary election.

Varga left MDF and joined Fidesz in 2002. He practised as a lawyer until the 2010 parliamentary election, when he secured a mandate from the Fidesz's Jász-Nagykun-Szolnok County Regional List. He was appointed a member of the Committee on Immunity, Incompatibility, and Mandate on 14 May 2010, and of the Constitutional, Judicial, and Standing Orders Committee on 2 November 2010.

Varga was made Chairman of the Board of the Central European Press and Media Foundation (Kesma), which established as a single giant umbrella-organization of pro-government media in November 2018. He was interviewed by Behir.hu on 4 February 2019, where he said he prefers reading opposition and independent media products, where quality is more balanced. Varga announced his resignation as board chair within hours.

== Controversy ==
In September 2012, Varga made controversial remarks on domestic violence during a parliamentary debate. He said there would be no domestic violence if Hungarian women had four or five children instead of only one or two. After that, several NGOs staged a demonstration on Kossuth tér to draw attention to violence against women, and to speak up for women's rights more generally. Following the outcry, Fidesz lawmakers decided that parliament should decide about incorporating domestic violence into the country's new Penal Code as a separate offence, a demand signed by 105,000 people in an initiative.
