= Zethus =

Zethus may refer to:

- Zethus, the husband of the nymph Thebe in Greek mythology
- Zethus (wasp), a genus of potter wasps
- Zethus (crater), a crater on Jupiter's moon Thebe
