= Stéphane =

- Gender: Male (rarely female)
- Language: French

Origin
- Word/name: Greek

Stéphane is a French given name, an equivalent of Stephen/Steven. The word derives from the Greek word "στεφάνι" (stefáni) n (plural στεφάνια), meaning wreath, garland (of flowers), and the verb "στέφω" (stéfo), meaning "to crown", following the protoindoeuropean root "*stÁbʰ-".

Notable people with this given name include:

- Stéphane Adam (born 1969), French footballer
- Stéphane Agbre Dasse (born 1989), Burkinabé football player
- Stéphane Allagnon, French film director and screenwriter
- Stéphane Antiga (born 1976), French volleyball player
- Stéphane Artano, French politician
- Stéphane Audran, French film actress
- Stéphane Augé (born 1974), French road racing cyclist
- Stéphane Auger (born 1970), Canadian hockey referee
- Stéphane Auvray, Guadeloupian footballer
- Stéphane Azambre, French cross-country skier and biathlete
- Stéphane Bancel (born 1972/1973), French billionaire businessman
- Stéphane Beauregard (born 1968), Canadian ice hockey player
- Stéphane Belmondo, French jazz trumpeter, flugelhornist, and drummer
- Stéphane Bergeron, Canadian politician
- Stéphane Bernadis, French figure skater
- Stéphane Besle, French footballer
- Stéphane Biakolo, Cameroonian and French footballer
- Stéphane Billette, Canadian politician
- Stéphane Maurice Bongho-Nouarra (1937–2007), Congolese politician
- Stéphane Bonneau, Canadian tennis player
- Stéphane Bonnes, French footballer
- Stéphane Bonsergent, French racing cyclist
- Stéphane Borbiconi, French football player
- Stéphane Boudin, French interior designer and a president of Maison Jansen
- Stéphane Bredin (born 1976), French civil servant
- Stéphane Breitwieser, French art thief and author
- Stéphane Bruey, French footballer
- Stéphane Bré, French football referee
- Stéphane Buckland, athletics competitor
- Stéphane Bureau, Canadian journalist, TV interviewer and producer of TV shows and documentary series
- Stéphane Bédard, Canadian lawyer and politician
- Stéphane Caristan, French athlete
- Stéphane Carnot, French footballer
- Stéphane Caron, French swimmer
- Stéphane Cassard, French footballer
- Stéphane Chapuisat, Swiss footballer
- Stéphane Clamens, French sports shooter
- Stéphane Collet, Malagasy and French footballer
- Stéphane Courtois, French historian and university professor
- Stéphane Crête, Canadian actor and comedian
- Stéphane Dalmat, French association football player
- Stéphane Darbion, French footballer
- Stéphane Demers, Canadian actor
- Stéphane Demets, Belgian football manager and former player
- Stéphane Demilly, French politician of the Union of Democrats and Independents (UDI)
- Stéphane Demol, Belgian professional football player and manager
- Stéphane Denève, French conductor
- Stéphane Derenoncourt, French winemaker
- Stéphane Diagana, French track and field sprinter and hurdler
- Stéphane Dimy, Ivorian footballer
- Stéphane Dion, Canadian diplomat, academic and former politician
- Stéphane Ducret, Swiss artist
- Stéphane Dujarric (born 1966), spokesperson under UN Secretary-General Kofi Annan
- Stéphane Dumont, French association football player and manager
- Stéphane Émard-Chabot, Canadian politician
- Stéphane Fiset, Canadian ice hockey player
- Stéphane Fortin (born 1974), Canadian football player
- Stéphane Franke, French athletics competitor
- Stéphane Freiss, French film, television, and stage actor
- Stéphane Galland, Belgian jazz drummer and composer
- Stéphane Garcia, Swiss football midfielder
- Stéphane Gendron, Canadian politician
- Stéphane Gillet, Luxembourgish footballer
- Stéphane de Gérando, French composer, conductor, multimedia artist, and researcher
- Stéphane Glas, French rugby Union footballer
- Stéphane Goubert, French road bicycle racer
- Stéphane Grappelli, French jazz violinist
- Stéphane Grichting (born 1979), Swiss football player
- Stéphane Grégoire, French race car driver
- Stéphane Guillaume, Haitian footballer
- Stéphane Guivarc'h (born 1970), French football player
- Stéphane Guérin-Tillié, French actor, director, and screen writer
- Stéphane Haccoun, French boxer
- Stéphane Henchoz, Swiss footballer and coach
- Stéphane Heulot, French road racing cyclist
- Stéphane Kingue Mpondo, Cameroonian footballer
- Stéphane Lambiel (born 1985), Swiss figure skater
- Stéphane Landois (born 1994), French equestrian
- Stéphane Laporte, French track and field athlete
- Stéphane Le Foll, French politician
- Stéphane Lecat, French long-distance swimmer
- Stéphane Leduc, French biologist
- Stéphane Lhomme, French activist
- Stéphane Lupasco, Romanian philosopher
- Stéphane Léoni, French former footballer
- Stéphane M'Bia, Cameroonian professional footballer
- Stéphane Mahé, French former professional footballer and former manager of Saint Nazaire FC
- Stéphane Mallarmé, French poet and critic
- Stéphane Mallat, French applied mathematician
- Stéphane Mangione, French footballer
- Stéphane Martine, French Guianese footballer
- Stéphane Masala (born 1976), French footballer and manager
- Stéphane Matteau, Canadian ice hockey player
- Stéphane Mbia, Cameroonian midfielder
- Stéphane Mertens, Belgian motorcycle road racer
- Stéphane Michon, French Nordic combined skier
- Stéphane Morin, Canadian ice hockey player
- Stéphane Morisot, French football defender
- Stéphane N'Guéma, Gabonese footballer
- Stéphane Nomis, French judoka
- Stéphane Noro, French football player
- Stéphane Ortelli, Monegasque race car driver
- Stéphane Paille, French footballer
- Stéphane Paquette, Franco-Ontarian singer-songwriter, actor, and politician
- Stéphane Pasquier, French flat racing jockey
- Stéphane Pedrazzi, French journalist
- Stéphane Pedron, French footballer
- Stéphane Pelle, Cameroonian basketball player
- Stéphane Persol (born 1968), French former football player
- Stéphane Peterhansel, French rally driver
- Stéphane Pichot, French professional football coach and former defender
- Stéphane Picq, French video game music composer
- Stéphane Pignol, French footballer
- Stéphane Pocrain, French politician and TV journalist
- Stéphane Pompougnac, French DJ and record producer
- Stéphane Porato, French football player
- Stéphane Poulat, French triathlete
- Stéphane Poulhies, French road bicycle racer
- Stéphane Pounewatchy, French former footballer
- Stéphane Pourcain, French politician and TV journalist
- Stéphane Praxis Rabemananjara, Malagasy footballer
- Stéphane Provost, French Canadian National Hockey League (NHL) linesman
- Stéphane Pédron, French footballer
- Stéphane Quintal, Canadian ice hockey player
- Stéphane Richer (ice hockey defenceman) (born 1966), Canadian ice hockey player
- Stéphane Richer (ice hockey forward) (born 1966), Canadian ice hockey player
- Stéphane Rideau, French actor
- Stéphane Robidas, Canadian ice hockey player
- Stéphane Rousseau, Canadian actor and comedian
- Stéphane Roy (ice hockey, born 1967) (born 1967), ice hockey player
- Stéphane Roy (ice hockey, born 1976) (born 1976), ice hockey player
- Stéphane Ruffier, French association football player
- Stéphane Samson, French footballer
- Stéphane Sanseverino, French singer, guitarist and songwriter of Neapolitan descent
- Stéphane Sarni, Italian footballer
- Stéphane Sarrazin, French racing and rally driver
- Stéphane Sednaoui, French music video director, photographer, film producer and actor
- Stéphane Sessegnon, Beninese footballer
- Stéphane Stoecklin, French handball player
- Stéphane Traineau, French judoka
- Stéphane Travert (born 1969), French politician
- Stéphane Tremblay, Canadian politician
- Stéphane Udry, Swiss astronomer
- Stéphane Van Der Heyden, Belgian football coach and former player
- Stéphane Venne, Canadian songwriter and composer
- Stéphane Viry, French politician
- Stéphane Vossart, French swimmer
- Stéphane Yelle, Canadian ice hockey player
- Stéphane Ziani, French footballer
- Stéphane Zubar (born 1986), French football player
- Micius Stephane (1912–2012) Haitian painter

== See also ==
- Stéphane Ratel Organisation, motorsports organization
- Étienne
- Stéphanie
- Stephen
- Stephane (headdress)
