= Teppo (name) =

Teppo is a male Finnish name that originated as a diminutive of the name Tapani.

It is an uncommon given name, and is derived from Stefanos, a Greek name that means, roughly translated, 'laurel' or 'crowned' or 'crown'. The name made its way through the Russian name Stefan (nickname Stepan, or Stjopa) to Karelian Stjoppi, from where it came to the Finnish version Teppo. However, some claim the name's origin is the Greek name Teofilus ('God's friend') or Teodor ('God's gift').

In Finland, Teppo was the name of a pagan god, Travel-Teppo, who was prayed to in order to guide the way and bless travels. In the 19th century, it began to be used as a normal first name. The most popular time for the name Teppo was from 1960 to 1980. In 2005, 3841 men had been given the name Teppo.

Teppo can also be a surname, but it is rare.

== People with the given name ==
- Teppo Hauta-aho, double bassist and composer
- Teppo Felin, professor at Oxford University
- Teppo Marttinen (born 1997), Finnish footballer
- Teppo Numminen, professional hockey defenceman
- Teppo Rastio, retired professional ice hockey player
- Teppo Ruohonen, Finnish singer
- Teppo Turkki, writer and researcher

== People with the surname ==
- Jaakko Teppo, singer-songwriter
