= Stevie =

Stevie may refer to:

== People with the name ==
=== Given name ===
- Stevie (given name), a list of people

=== People with the nickname or alias ===
- Stevie B, American singer, songwriter and record producer Steven Bernard Hill (born 1958)
- Stevie J, stage name of American record producer and songwriter Steven Aaron Jordan (born 1973)
- Stevie Lee (1969-2020), a.k.a. Puppet, an American midget wrestler, actor, and wrestling promoter also known for appearances in Jackass
- Stevie Nicks, stage name of American singer-songwriter, solo-vocalist, and vocalist of Fleetwood Mac
- Stevie Rachelle, lead singer of 1980s glam metal band Tuff, born Steven Howard Hanseter
- Stevie Ray, ring name of American professional wrestler Lash Huffman (born 1958)
- Stevie Ray Vaughan, American blues singer and guitarist
- Stevie Richards, ring name of American professional wrestler Michael Stephen Manna (born 1971)
- Stevie Smith, English poet and novelist Florence Margaret Smith
- Stevie Stone, stage name of American rapper Stephen Williams (born 1981)
- Stevie Wonder, stage name of American singer-songwriter, multi-instrumentalist, record producer and activist Stevland Hardaway Morris (born 1950)

== Arts, entertainment, and media ==
=== Fictional characters ===
- Stevie Ray Botwin, a fictional character in the TV series Weeds
- Stephanie Stevie Hunter, a Marvel Comics character
- Stephanie "Stevie" Mason, a fictional character in the TV series Knight Rider
- Stevie Budd, a fictional character in the TV series Schitt's Creek
- Stevie Kenarban, the title character’s best friend on Malcolm in the Middle
- Stevie Janowski, a fictional character in the TV series Eastbound & Down

=== Films ===
- Stevie (1978 film), a British biographical film based on the play
- Stevie (2002 film), an American documentary

=== Music ===
- Stevie (album), by Madlib
- "Stevie" (Kasabian song), 2014
- "Stevie" (Brian Wilson song), 1981
- "Stevie" (Spiderbait song), a 1999 sing by Australian alt-rock band Spiderbait
- "Stevie", a song from Live! Go for What You Know by Pat Travers

=== Other uses in arts, entertainment, and media ===
- Stevie (play), a 1977 play by Hugh Whitemore about the life of poet Stevie Smith
- Stevie TV, a former TV show
- Stevie, a 1969 book by John Steptoe

== Other uses ==
- Stevie (text editor)

== See also ==
- The Adventures of Stevie V
