= István Nagy (politician, born 1954) =

Hungarian politician

Member of the National Assembly
- In office 16 May 2006 – 5 May 2014

Personal details
- Born: 1 January 1954 (age 72) Budapest, Hungary
- Party: Fidesz
- Children: 3
- Profession: politician

István Nagy (born January 1, 1954) is a Hungarian politician, member of the National Assembly (MP) from Fidesz Budapest Regional List from 2010 to 2014. He was also a Member of Parliament from the party's National List from 2006 to 2010.

Nagy was a member of the Committee on Employment and Labour from May 30, 2006 to May 5, 2014.

== Personal life ==
He is married and has three children.
