= Ivan Milčetić bibliography =

Ivan Milčetić Matina bibliography
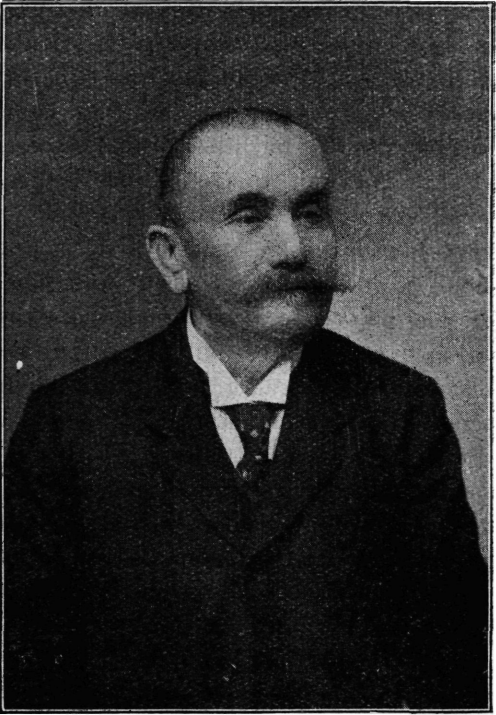
- Articles↙: "Čakavština Kvarnerskih otoka" (1895); "Hrvatska glagoļska bibliografija" (1911)

This is a list of works by Ivan Milčetić, the Croatian philologist and literary historian. The most comprehensive bibliography dedicated to his works is Nedjeljka Paro's 2002 monograph Bibliography of Ivan Milčetić and Literature about Ivan Milčetić (Serbo-Croatian: Bibliografija Ivana Milčetića i literatura o Ivanu Milčetiću). The first, The Literary Work of Ivan Milčetić (Serbo-Croatian: Književni rad Ivana Milčetića), was published shortly after the writer's death by August Musić in 1923. Other bibliographies have focused on particular sets of his works, such as his publications in the magazine Vienac.

== Biography ==
Biography of Ivan Josip Vitezić, Bishop of Krk (1878)

- "Ivan Josip Vitezić, biskup krčki" [Ivan Josip Vitezić, Bishop of Krk]. Vienac: zabavi i pouci (in Serbo-Croatian). Vol. X, no. 22. 1878-06-01. pp. 352–355.
- "Naš mladji naraštaj i August Šenoa" [Our Younger Generation and August Šenoa]. Vienac: zabavi i pouci (in Serbo-Croatian). Vol. XIII, no. 52. 1881-01-22. pp. 832–833.
- "Kipar Rendić u Trstu" [The Sculptor Rendić in Trst]. Vienac: zabavi i pouci (in Serbo-Croatian). Vol. XIV, no. 35. 1882-09-02. pp. 566–567.
- "Vladislav Vežić". Vienac: zabavi i pouci (in Serbo-Croatian). Vol. XV, no. 1. 1883-01-06. pp. 16–17.
- "Stjepan Ilijašević". Vienac: zabavi i pouci (in Serbo-Croatian). Vol. XV, no. 14. 1883-04-07. pp. 226–227.
- "O Andriji Jambrešiću" [On Andrija Jambrešić]. Vienac: zabavi i pouci (in Serbo-Croatian). Vol. XIX. 1887-03-05. pp. 158–159, 172–175, 187–190, 206–207, 235–238. Issues 10–13, 15. The continuations were published March 12, 19, 26, and April 9.
- "F. Pavačić i njegove slike" [F. Pavačić and His Books]. Vienac: zabavi i pouci (in Serbo-Croatian). Vol. XX, no. 22. 1888-06-16. pp. 382–383.

4th edition of Niccolò Tommaseo's Scintille (Iskrice), with introduction by Milčetić

- "O životu i književnom radu Nikole Tommasea". Iskrice [On the Life and Literary Work of Nikola Tommaseo] (in Serbo-Croatian) (4th ed.). Zagreb: Matica hrvatska. 1888. pp. VII–LXXVIII.
- "† Vladislav Vežić". Vienac: zabavi i pouci (in Serbo-Croatian). Vol. XXVI, no. 34. 1894-08-18. p. 532.
- "Dr. Vatroslav Oblak". Zbornik za narodni život i običaje Južnih Slavena (in Serbo-Croatian). 1. JAZU: 364–368. 1896.
- "Luka Zima". Ljetopis Jugoslavenske akademije znanosti i umjetnosti (in Serbo-Croatian). 22. JAZU: 177–181. 1907.
- "Dr. Julije Bajamonti i ńegova djela" [Dr. Julije Bajamonti and His Works]. Rad Jugoslavenske akademije znanosti i umjetnosti: Filologičko-historički i filosofičko-juridički razredi (in Serbo-Croatian). 54. JAZU: 97–250. 1912.
Obituary for August Šenoa (1881)

Biography of Ivan Rendić (1882)

Biography of Vladislav Vežić (1883)

Biography of Stjepan Ilijašević (1883)

Biography of Andrija Jambrešić (1887)

Biography of Franjo Pavačić (1888)

Obituary for Vladislav Vežić (1894)

Obituary for Vatroslav Oblak (1896)

Obituary for Luka Zima (1907)

Biography and bibliography of Julije Bajamonti (1912)

== Dialectology ==
The Chakavian Dialect of the Kvarner Islands (1895)

- "Jesu li naši kajkavci Hrvati? Govore li hrvatski?" [Are Our Kajkavians Croats? Do They Speak Croatian?]. Vienac: zabavi i pouci (in Serbo-Croatian). Vol. XII, no. 4–11. 1880-01-24. pp. 58–60, 73–74, 92, 94, 108, 123–124, 126, 140, 142, 153–155, 169–171. Continuations published January 31, February 2, 14, 21, 28, March 6, 13.
- "Das silbenbildende und silbenschliessende l im kroat. ča-Dialekte" [The Syllabic and Syllable-Final l in Croatian Ča-Dialects]. Archiv für slavische Philologie (in German). 11. Vienna: 365–367. 1888.
- "Čakavština Kvarnerskih otoka" [The Chakavian Dialect of the Kvarner Islands]. Rad Jugoslavenske akademije znanosti i umjetnosti: Filologičko-historički i filosofičko-juridički razredi (in Serbo-Croatian). 42. JAZU: 92–131. 1895.
- "O slovenskom književnom jeziku" [On the Slovene Literary Language]. Vienac: zabavi i pouci (in Serbo-Croatian). Vol. XXXI, no. 29. 1899-07-22. pp. 469–472.
- "O imperativu žimi, žiti (ži mi, ži ti = živ-ti, živsti)" [On the Imperative žimi, žiti (ži mi, ži ti = živ-ti, živsti)]. Ljetopis Jugoslavenske akademije znanosti i umjetnosti (in Serbo-Croatian). 31/II. JAZU: 74–77. 1916.
- "Dodatak mojemu člančiću "Ži mi, ži ti"" [Addendum to My Article "Ži mi, ži ti"]. Ljetopis Jugoslavenske akademije znanosti i umjetnosti (in Serbo-Croatian). 31/II. JAZU: 132. 1916.
Are Our Kajkavians Croats (1880)

The Syllabic and Syllable-Final l in Croatian Ča-Dialects (1888)

On the Slovene Literary Language (1899)

On the Imperative žimi, žiti (1916)

== Ethnology ==
- "Putne crtice iz Boke i Crne Gore" [Travel Outlines from Boka and Crna Gora]. Vienac: zabavi i pouci (in Serbo-Croatian). Vol. VIII. 1876. Issues 25, 26, 30, 31, 33, 36, 38, 41, 45.
- "Iz života starih Slovinaca" [From the Life of the Old Slavs]. Vienac: zabavi i pouci (in Serbo-Croatian). Vol. IX, no. 6–8. 1877.
- "S otoka Cresa" [From the Island of Cres]. Vienac: zabavi i pouci (in Serbo-Croatian). Vol. XVII, no. 29–32. 1885.
- "Koleda na otoku Krku i Lošinju" [Koleda on the Islands of Krk and Lošinj]. Vienac: zabavi i pouci (in Serbo-Croatian). Vol. XXII, no. 7–8. 1890.
- "Ženidbeni običaji: Iz Dubašnice na otoku Krku (Istra)". Zbornik za narodni život i običaje Južnih Slavena (in Serbo-Croatian). 1. JAZU: 162–171. 1896.
- Milčetić, Ivan; Zorić, Mate (1896). "Bilješke iz raznih krajeva: Božićni blagdani" [Notes from Various Regions: Christmas Holidays]. Zbornik za narodni život i običaje Južnih Slavena (in Serbo-Croatian). 1. JAZU: 216.
- "Prporuša". Zbornik za narodni život i običaje Južnih Slavena (in Serbo-Croatian). 1. JAZU: 217–218. 1896.
- "Koleda: Istra". Zbornik za narodni život i običaje Južnih Slavena (in Serbo-Croatian). 1. JAZU: 221–222. 1896.
- "Vukodlak i krsnik: Krk i Kastav u Istri" [The Wherewolf and Krsnik: Krk and Kastav in Istria]. Zbornik za narodni život i običaje Južnih Slavena (in Serbo-Croatian). 1. JAZU: 224–226. 1896.
- "Mrak i Bučan: Otok Krk, i kajkavci" [Mrak and Bučan: The Island of Krk, and Kajkavians]. Zbornik za narodni život i običaje Južnih Slavena (in Serbo-Croatian). 1. JAZU: 227. 1896.
- "Malić". Zbornik za narodni život i običaje Južnih Slavena (in Serbo-Croatian). 1. JAZU: 228. 1896.
- "Vještice: Otok Krk, i kajkavci" [Witches: The Island of Krk, and Kajkavians]. Zbornik za narodni život i običaje Južnih Slavena (in Serbo-Croatian). 1. JAZU: 232–233. 1896.
- "Mora i polegač: Krk, Kastav, i hrvatski kajkavci" [The Mora and Polegač: Krk, Kastav and Croatian Kajkavians]. Zbornik za narodni život i običaje Južnih Slavena (in Serbo-Croatian). 1. JAZU: 235–237. 1896.
- "Igre i plesovi: Kvarnerski otoci" [Games and Dances: Kvarner Islands]. Zbornik za narodni život i običaje Južnih Slavena (in Serbo-Croatian). 1. JAZU: 302–303. 1896.
- "O Moravskim Hrvatima" [On the Moravian Croats]. Vienac: zabavi i pouci (in Serbo-Croatian). Vol. XXX. 1898. Issues 30–32, 34, 36.
- O hrvatskim naseobinama u Moravskoj, Donjoj Austriji i Zapadnoj Ugarskoj: Narodopisne crtice. Zagreb: Dionička tiskara. 1899.
- "O ugarskim Hrvatima" [On the Hungarian Croats]. Vienac: zabavi i pouci (in Serbo-Croatian). Vol. XXXIII, no. 1. 1901.
- "Sitniji prilozi" [Minor Contributions]. Zbornik za narodni život i običaje Južnih Slavena (in Serbo-Croatian). 9. JAZU: 1–22. 1904.
- "Duhovne i šaljive pjesme iz Makarske" [Spiritual and Comical Songs from Makarska]. Građa za povijest književnosti hrvatske (in Serbo-Croatian). 5: 148–267. 1907.
- "Moja primjedba o narodnosti stanovnika grada Krka" [My Observations on the Ethnicity of the Citizens of Krk City]. Ljetopis Jugoslavenske akademije znanosti i umjetnosti (in Serbo-Croatian). 30. JAZU: 44–46. 1915.
- "Koleda u južnih Slavena: na osnovi istoričkih vijesti, narodnih pjesama i običaja našega vremena". Zbornik za narodni život i običaje Južnih Slavena (in Serbo-Croatian). 22. JAZU: 1–124. 1917.
- ""Pokršćanje za junaka"". Zbornik za narodni život i običaje Južnih Slavena (in Serbo-Croatian). 23. JAZU: 9–10. 1918.
- "Kršteńe mošta (Grad Varaždin)" [Christening the Bridge (Varaždin City)]. Zbornik za narodni život i običaje Južnih Slavena (in Serbo-Croatian). 24. JAZU: 319–322. 1919.

== Historiography ==
- "Varasdinensia". Vienac: zabavi i pouci (in Serbo-Croatian). Vol. XIII, no. 14. 1881-04-02. pp. 223–224.
- "Slovjenska akademija u Bologni" [The Slavic Academy in Bologna]. Vienac: zabavi i pouci (in Serbo-Croatian). Vol. XV, no. 33–34. 1883-08-18. pp. 532–. Continuation published August 25.
- "Bratska ljubav — u brojevima" [Brotherly Love — In Numbers]. Vienac: zabavi i pouci (in Serbo-Croatian). Vol. XXVII, no. 3. 1895.
- "Savez slavenskih akademija" [Alliance of Slavic Academies]. Ljetopis Jugoslavenske akademije znanosti i umjetnosti (in Serbo-Croatian). 26. JAZU: 255–264. 1911.
Critique of foreign language dominance at the Varaždin Theatre (1881)

Critique of Adam Mickiewicz's Slavic Academy in Bologna (1883)

== History ==
- "Stanislav Sočivica". Vienac: zabavi i pouci (in Serbo-Croatian). Vol. X, no. 4–7. 1878.
- "O Leđanu-gradu" [On Leđan-City]. Vienac: zabavi i pouci (in Serbo-Croatian). Vol. X, no. 25. 1878.
- Hrvati od Gaja do godine 1850: Kulturno-istorijski i književni pregled [Croats from Gaj to the Year 1850: Cultural-Historical and Literary Overview] (in Serbo-Croatian). Zagreb: Dionička tiskara. 1878.
- "Krčki knezovi i predaje o njima" [The Lords of Krk and Folktales about Them]. Vienac: zabavi i pouci (in Serbo-Croatian). Vol. XVI. 1884. Issues 20, 22, 23.
- "Arkeologično-istorične crtice s hrvatskih otoka I" [Archaeological-Historical Outlines from Croatian Islands I]. Vjestnik Kr. hrvatsko-slavonsko-dalmatinskog zemaljskog arkiva (in Serbo-Croatian) (6): 18–28. 1884-09-11. ISSN 0350-7165.
- "Arkeologično-istorične crtice s hrvatskih otoka II" [Archaeological-Historical Outlines from Croatian Islands II]. Vjestnik Kr. hrvatsko-slavonsko-dalmatinskog zemaljskog arkiva (in Serbo-Croatian) (6): 50–55. 1884-09-11. ISSN 0350-7165.
- "Arkeologično-istorične crtice s hrvatskih otoka III" [Archaeological-Historical Outlines from Croatian Islands III]. Vjestnik Kr. hrvatsko-slavonsko-dalmatinskog zemaljskog arkiva (in Serbo-Croatian) (6): 80–85. 1884-09-11. ISSN 0350-7165.
- "Arkeologično-istorične crtice s hrvatskih otoka IV" [Archaeological-Historical Outlines from Croatian Islands IV]. Vjestnik Kr. hrvatsko-slavonsko-dalmatinskog zemaljskog arkiva (in Serbo-Croatian) (6): 105–116. 1884-09-11. ISSN 0350-7165.
- "Sušak, opis i historija" [Sušak, Description and History]. Vienac: zabavi i pouci (in Serbo-Croatian). Vol. XX, no. 22. 1888.
- "Isprave za odnošaj Dubrovnika prema Veneciji" [Documents for the Relationship of Dubrovnik Towards Venice]. Starine Jugoslavenske akademije znanosti i umjetnosti (in Serbo-Croatian). 30. Zagreb: JAZU: 335–352. 1902.
- "Poslanice Nikole Nale vlastelima Hvarskijem, i ńih odgovori godišta 1540., 41., 57., 64" [Letters of Nikola Nale to the Landlords of Hvar, and Their Responses in the Years 1540., 41., 57., 64.]. Građa za povijest književnosti hrvatske (in Serbo-Croatian). 5: 303–309. 1907.
- "Pop Ivan Feretić, krčki istorik (1769–1839)" [Priest Ivan Feretić, Krk Historian (1769–1839)]. Građa za povijest književnosti hrvatske (in Serbo-Croatian). 7: 329–361. 1912.
- "Miscellanea iz Šafaŕikove ostavštine u Pragu" [Miscellanea from Šafaŕik's Estate in Prague]. Građa za povijest književnosti hrvatske (in Serbo-Croatian). 7: 361–364. 1912.
- ""Della storia civile e cronologica della terra sive castello di Lossin Grande nella Dalmazia, ventilata nell' anno 1791": Napisao lošinjski bilježnik Martin Botterini". Ljetopis Jugoslavenske akademije znanosti i umjetnosti (in Serbo-Croatian). 30. JAZU: 23–44. 1915.

=== Literary history ===
- "Kratka povijest književnosti hrvatske i srpske od I. Filipovića" [A Brief History of Croatian and Serbian Literature from I. Filipović]. Vienac: zabavi i pouci (in Serbo-Croatian). Vol. VIII, no. 1–3. 1876.
- "Istorija slavjanskih literatur A. N. Pypina i V. D. Spasovića" [Istorija slavjanskih literatur by A. N. Pypin and V. D. Spasović]. Vienac: zabavi i pouci (in Serbo-Croatian). Vol. XI, no. 35–36. 1879.
- "Relković u hrvatskoj književnosti" [Relković in Croatian Literature]. Vienac: zabavi i pouci (in Serbo-Croatian). Vol. XIII, no. 29–33. 1881.
- O poslanicama u dubrovačko-dalmatinskoj periodi hrvatske literature [On Letters in the Dubrovnik-Dalmatia Period of Croatian Literature] (in Serbo-Croatian). Varaždin: Brzotisak Platzera sina. 1882.
  - Reviewed by Vatroslav Jagić in 1883.
- Milčetić, Ivan, ed. (1882). Sabrani spisi Ivana Vončine ml [Collected Works of Ivan Vončina ml.] (in Serbo-Croatian). Zagreb: Akademijska knjižara L. Hartmana.
- "Nepoznata dosele knjiga P. Trubera" [Hitherto Unknown Book of P. Truber]. Vienac: zabavi i pouci (in Serbo-Croatian). Vol. XV, no. 30. 1883-07-28. p. 492.
- "Sava, Dunav, Balkan" [Sava, Danube, Balkan]. Vienac: zabavi i pouci (in Serbo-Croatian). Vol. XVI, no. 39. 1884.
- "Crtice iz hrvatske književnosti" [Sketches from Croatian Literature]. Vienac: zabavi i pouci (in Serbo-Croatian). Vol. XIX, no. 37. 1887.
- Palmotić, Junij (1890). Milčetić, Ivan (ed.). Pavlimir: Drama Gjona Gjora Palmotića. Zagreb: Dionička tiskara.
- "Izvješće o 1.sv. češkoga Narodnopisnoga Vjesnika" [Report on the 1st Volume of the Czech Narodnopisni Vjesnik]. Vienac: zabavi i pouci (in Serbo-Croatian). Vol. XXIX, no. 41. 1897.
- "O 15. sv. bugarskoga 'Sbornika za narodni umotvorenija i knižnina'" [On the 15th Volume of the Bulgarian 'Sbornik za narodni umotvorenija i knižnina']. Vienac: zabavi i pouci (in Serbo-Croatian). Vol. XXXI, no. 20. 1899.
- "Paprike harvatske leta 1846" [Paprike harvatske of the Year 1846]. Građa za povijest književnosti hrvatske (in Serbo-Croatian). 5: 118–138. 1907.
- "Šulekova pisma I. Trnskom" [Šulek's Letters to I. Trnski]. Građa za povijest književnosti hrvatske (in Serbo-Croatian). 5: 278–292. 1907.
- "Dva lista R. Boškovića" [Two Leaves of R. Bošković]. Građa za povijest književnosti hrvatske (in Serbo-Croatian). 5: 293–297. 1907.
- "Grof Janko Drašković i negova žena Frańica O. Utješenoviću" [Graf Janko Drašković and His Wife Frańica to O. Utješenović]. Građa za povijest književnosti hrvatske (in Serbo-Croatian). 5: 298–299. 1907.
- "Fran Kurelac Ivanu Fiaminu" [Fran Kurelac to Ivan Fiamin]. Građa za povijest književnosti hrvatske (in Serbo-Croatian). 5: 300–302. 1907.
- "Blaž Stulli Ludevitu Gaju 1841" [Blaž Stulli to Ljudevit Gaj in 1841]. Građa za povijest književnosti hrvatske (in Serbo-Croatian). 5: 310. 1907.
- "Palmotićeva "Kristijada" u Vatikanskoj kńižnici" [Palmotić's "Kristijada" in the Vatican Library]. Građa za povijest književnosti hrvatske (in Serbo-Croatian). 7: 307–312. 1912.
- "Spljećanin Matija Alberti Dubrovčanima" [Split Native Matija Alberti to the Residents of Dubrovnik]. Građa za povijest književnosti hrvatske (in Serbo-Croatian). 7: 314–320. 1912.
- "Pavlinac Antun Dolinić" [The Pauline Antun Dolinić]. Građa za povijest književnosti hrvatske (in Serbo-Croatian). 7: 324–328. 1912.
- "Petar Stanković iz Istre, hrvatski pisac" [Petar Stanković of Istria, Croatian Author]. Građa za povijest književnosti hrvatske (in Serbo-Croatian). 7: 364–366. 1912.
- "Dva zaboravlena kńiževnika iz Kaštela" [Two Forgotten Writers from Kaštela]. Građa za povijest književnosti hrvatske (in Serbo-Croatian). 8: 181–204. 1916.
- "Hrvatski kńiževni prilozi iz Međumurja i okolice grada Šoprona: Jedan hrvatski preporoditel iz Međumurja" [Croatian Literary Contributions from Međimurje and the Environs of the City of Šopron: A Croatian Enlightener from Međimurje]. Građa za povijest književnosti hrvatske (in Serbo-Croatian). 8: 395–439. 1916.
- "Hrvatski kńiževni prilozi iz Međumurja i okolice grada Šoprona: K hrvatskoj pučkoj literaturi u Međimurju i oko Šoprona" [Croatian Literary Contributions from Međimurje and the Environs of the City of Šopron: On Croatian Folk Literature in Međimurje and Around Šopron]. Građa za povijest književnosti hrvatske (in Serbo-Croatian). 5: 439–461. 1916.
- "Zaninovićeve pjesme" [Zaninović's Poems]. Građa za povijest književnosti hrvatske (in Serbo-Croatian). 8: 187–195. 1920.
Rediscovery of Primož Trubar's Catehismus s dveima islagama (1883)

== Philology ==
- "Gajev pravopis" [Gaj's Orthography]. Vienac: zabavi i pouci (in Serbo-Croatian). Vol. XXIII, no. 39. 1891.
- "Gundulićev "Osman" u Vatikanskoj kńižnici" [Gundulić's "Osman" in the Vatican Library]. Građa za povijest književnosti hrvatske (in Serbo-Croatian). 7: 305–307. 1912.
- "Hrvatske riječi u talijanskoga pjesnika XV. vijeka" [Use of Croatian Words by a XV. Century Italian Poet]. Građa za povijest književnosti hrvatske (in Serbo-Croatian). 7: 312–314. 1912.

=== Glagolitic philology ===
Croatian Glagolitic Bibliography: Part I

- "O novom izdanju hrvatskih liturgičkih knjiga" [On the New Edition of Croatian Liturgical Books]. Vienac: zabavi i pouci (in Serbo-Croatian). Vol. XV, no. 16–18. 1883-04-21. pp. 264, 266, 281–282, 293–296, 379–380. Continuations published April 28, May 5, September 9. The last edition includes a letter from Vatroslav Jagić.
- "Glagolski nadpis iz Beloga na otoku Cresu" [A Glagolitic Inscription from Beli on the Island of Cres]. Vjestnik Kr. hrvatsko-slavonsko-dalmatinskog zemaljskog arkiva (in Serbo-Croatian) (5): 77–80. 1883-11-09. ISSN 0350-7165.
- Milčetić, Ivan (1885). "Ein Beitrag zur kroatisch-glagolitischen Bibliographie" [A Contribution to Croatian-Glagolitic Bibliography]. Archiv für slavische Philologie (in German). 8: 247–356.
- "Prilozi za literaturu hrvatskih glagolskih spomenika: Ivančićev zbornik" [Contributions to the Literature of Croatian Glagolitic Monuments: Ivančić's Miscellany]. Starine Jugoslavenske akademije znanosti i umjetnosti (in Serbo-Croatian). 23. Zagreb: JAZU: 40–79. 1890.
- "Prilozi za literaturu hrvatskih glagolskih spomenika: Nepoznata glagolska kńižica tiskana godine 1496" [Contributions to the Literature of Croatian Glagolitic Monuments: An Unknown Glagolitic Booklet Printed 1496]. Starine Jugoslavenske akademije znanosti i umjetnosti (in Serbo-Croatian). 23. Zagreb: JAZU: 80–83. 1890.
- "Prilozi za literaturu hrvatskih glagolskih spomenika: Još jedna rijetka glagolska tiskana kńiga" [Contributions to the Literature of Croatian Glagolitic Monuments: Another Rare Glagolitic Printed Book]. Starine Jugoslavenske akademije znanosti i umjetnosti (in Serbo-Croatian). 23. Zagreb: JAZU: 84–153. 1890.
- "Prilozi za literaturu hrvatskih glagoljskih spomenika: Zakon brašćine svetoga duha u Baški" [Contributions to the Literature of Croatian Glagolitic Monuments: The Law of the Brotherhood of the Holy Spirit in Baška]. Starine Jugoslavenske akademije znanosti i umjetnosti (in Serbo-Croatian). 25: 138–151. 1892.
- "Književno pismo o hrvatskom narječju otoka Lošinja i o dubravačkim književnim poslanicama" [Literary Writing on the Croatian Dialect of the Island of Lošinj and on the Literary Letters of Dubrave]. Vienac: zabavi i pouci (in Serbo-Croatian). Vol. XXXII, no. 44. 1900.
- "Prilozi za literaturu hrvatskih glagoljskih spomenika: Hrvatski lucidar" [Contributions to the Literature of Croatian Glagolitic Monuments: The Croatian Lucidarium]. Starine Jugoslavenske akademije znanosti i umjetnosti (in Serbo-Croatian). 30: 257–334. 1902.
- "Tri glagoljske listine iz Istre iz XV. vijeka" [Three Glagolitic Documents from Istria from the XV. Century]. Vjesnik Arheološkog muzeja u Zagrebu (in Serbo-Croatian). 8 (1): 30–33. 1905-11-19.
- "Večernje na nedělje i svetce po sve lěto, po crkvenim knjigam glagolskim. S priloženjem jutrń i časov velih blagdan i drugih molitav". Savremenik. III (3): 185–186. 1908.
- "Prethodni izvještaj o izučavanju hrvatske glagoljske književnosti". Ljetopis Jugoslavenske akademije znanosti i umjetnosti (in Serbo-Croatian). 23. JAZU: 169–200. 1908.
- "Berčićeva glagoļska zbirka u Petrogradu" [Berčić's Glagolitic Collection in Saint Petersburg]. Ljetopis Jugoslavenske akademije znanosti i umjetnosti (in Serbo-Croatian). 26. JAZU: 265–271. 1911.
- "Hrvatska glagoļska bibliografija: Dio I" [Croatian Glagolitic Bibliography: Part I]. Starine Jugoslavenske akademije znanosti i umjetnosti (in Serbo-Croatian). 33. Zagreb: JAZU: 1–505. 1911.
  - Reviewed by Ana Šimić in 2021.
- "Školske vježbe s otoka Krka" [School Exercises from the Island of Krk]. Građa za povijest književnosti hrvatske (in Serbo-Croatian). 7: 320–323. 1912.
- "Stari glagolski recepti, egzorcizmi i zapisi" [Old Glagolitic Recipes, Exorcisms and Notes]. Vjesnik Staroslavenske akademije (in Serbo-Croatian). I. Krk (published 1913): 61–69. 1912.
- "Otok Krk i glagoļska kńiževnost" [The Island of Krk and Glagolitic Literature]. Vjesnik Staroslavenske akademije u Krku (in Serbo-Croatian). 2 (published 1914): 19–28. 1913.
- "Matije Sovića predgovor "Slavenskoj gramatici"" [Matija Sović's Introduction to "Slavenska gramatika"]. Starine Jugoslavenske akademije znanosti i umjetnosti (in Serbo-Croatian). 35. Zagreb: JAZU: 369–425. 1916.
- "Hrvatski prijevod bule pape Grgura XI. Pavlinima: regule svetoga Augustina na "Ugrih" i po drugim stranama, izdana u Avignonu god. 1371" [The Croatian Translation of the Bulla of Pope Gregory XI to the Paulines: The Regulae of Saint Augustine Among "Hungarians" and in Other Regions, Published in Avignon the Year 1371]. Starine Jugoslavenske akademije znanosti i umjetnosti (in Serbo-Croatian). 35. Zagreb: JAZU: 426–431. 1916.
- "Zur Kritik der "Hrv. glagoljska bibliografija"" [On the Critique of "Hrv. glagoljska bibliografija"]. Archiv für slavische Philologie (in German). 36. Vienna: 557–559. 1916.
- Štefanić, Vjekoslav, ed. (1955-11-30). "Berčićeva zbirka glagoljskih rukopisa i štampanih knjiga u Lenjingradu" [Berčić's Collection of Glagolitic Manuscripts and Printed Books in Leningrad]. Radovi Staroslavenskog instituta (in Serbo-Croatian). 2 (2). Zagreb: 93–128. Posthumous.
Review of the Parčić editions of Glagolitic liturgical books (1883)

Description of the Berčić collection in Saint Petersburg (1911)

== Book reviews ==
- "Prilog k hrvatskim književnim starinam" [Contribution to Croatian Literary Antiquities]. Vienac: zabavi i pouci (in Serbo-Croatian). XV (13): 216. 1883-03-31.
Review of Ivan Kukuljević's Književnici u Hrvatah iz prve polovine XVII vieka s ove strane Velebita (1883)

== Letters ==
- Milčetić, Ivan (1903). "Paval Bogović-Šimov (Konac)" (PDF). Naša sloga: Poučni, gospodarski i politički list (in Serbo-Croatian). Vol. 34, no. 31. p. 4.
- Milčetić, Ivan (1903). "Paval Bogović-Šimov" (PDF). Naša sloga: Poučni, gospodarski i politički list (in Serbo-Croatian). Vol. 34, no. 30. p. 3.
- Pismo Ivana Milčetića Ivanu Kostrenčiću [Letter of Ivan Milčetić to Ivan Kostrenčić] (in Serbo-Croatian). Rijeka. 1889-03-15.

== Bibliography ==
- Šimić, Ana (2021). "Prvi se pamte – noćni istraživač Ivan Milčetić". Žgombićev zbornik. Archived from the original on 2021-04-14.
- n.s. (2013). "Milčetić, Ivan". Hrvatska enciklopedija, mrežno izdanje. Leksikografski zavod Miroslav Krleža.
- Banov-Depope, Estela (2011). "Ivan Milčetić o koledarskim pjesmama i običajima". Zvuci i znaci: Interkulturalne i intermedijalne kroatističke studije [Ivan Milčetić on Carolling Songs and Traditions] (in Serbo-Croatian). Leykam International. pp. 147–158. ISBN 978-953-7534-72-1.
- Lukić, Milica (2010). "Polemike oko jezika i pisma liturgijskih staroslavenskih knjiga u 19. stoljeću, s osobitim obzirom na tekstove Dragutina Antuna Parčića i Ivana Milčetića". Knjige poštujući, knjigama poštovan: Zbornik o 70. rođendanu Josipa Bratulića [Polemics about the Language and Script of Old Slavonic Liturgical Books in the 19th Century, With Reference to the Texts of Dragutin Antun Parčić and Ivan Milčetić] (in Serbo-Croatian). Zagreb: Matica hrvatska. pp. 283–292. ISBN 978-953-150-906-0.
- Babić, Vanda (2009). Putopisne refleksije Ivana Milčetića o Crnoj Gori, P. P. Njegošu i I. Mažuraniću. Međunarodni i međudržavni (RH-CG) znanstveni skup "Dani Ivana Mažuranića (1814.-1890.)" Cetinje, Crna Gora.
- Grbić, Jadranka (2006-12-20). "Putopisne refleksije Ivana Milčetića: Među Hrvatima Moravske, Donje Austrije i zapadne Ugarske" [The Travelogue Reflections of Ivan Milčetić: Among the Croats of Moravia, Lower Austria and Western Hungary]. Etnološka tribina (in Serbo-Croatian). 36 (29): 133–149. eISSN 1848-9540.
- Dürrigl, Marija-Ana (2006). "Prinos Ivana Milčetića poznavanju medicinske prošlosti u Primorju". Zbornik sažetaka 7. znanstvenog skupa Rijeka i Riječani u medicinskoj povjesnici. Reading: Hrvatsko znanstveno društvo za povijest zdravstvene kulture. pp. 13–14.
- n.s. (2005). "Milčetić, Ivan". Istarska enciklopedija. p. 489. ISBN 953-6036-83-5.
- Sapunar, Andrea (2004). "Milčetićev doprinos proučavanju povijesti i kulture gradišćanskih Hrvata". Mostariensia (19): 107–118. ISSN 1023-8638.
- Nazor, Anica (2003). "Milčetić i Berčićeva glagoljska zbirka u Petrogradu" [Milčetić and Berčić's Glagolitic Collection in Petersburg]. Republika (in Serbo-Croatian). 59 (3): 113–115. ISSN 0350-1337.
- Galović, Tomislav (2002-12-22). "Kako je Ivan Milčetić prikazao prošlost svoga rodnog kraja (ili Arkeologično-istočne crtice s hrvatskih otoka i Dubašnica u njima)" [How Ivan Milčetić Presented the History of His Native Region (or Archaeological-Historical Outlines from Croatian Islands and Dubašnica in Them]. Historijski zbornik (in Serbo-Croatian). 55: 237–245. ISSN 0351-2193.
- Paro, Nedjeljka (2002). "Bibliografija Ivana Milčetića i literatura o Ivanu Milčetiću" [Bibliography of Ivan Milčetić and Literature about Ivan Milčetić]. Zbornik o Ivanu Milčetiću, književnom povjesničaru, filologu i etnologu (PDF). Znanstveni zbornici (in Serbo-Croatian). Vol. 7. Zagreb: Hrvatski studiji Sveučilišta u Zagrebu. pp. 475–508. ISBN 953-6682-34-6.
- Fišer, Ernest (2002). "Varaždinsko razdoblje života i rada Ivana Milčetića" [Ivan Milčetić His Life and Work in Varaždin]. Zbornik o Ivanu Milčetiću, književnom povjesničaru, filologu i etnologu (PDF). Znanstveni zbornici (in Serbo-Croatian). Vol. 7. Zagreb: Hrvatski studiji Sveučilišta u Zagrebu. pp. 465–472. ISBN 953-6682-34-6.
- Marijanović, Stanislav (2002). "Milčetićeve prosudbe Relkovićeva Satira i mjesta M. A. Relkovića u hrvatskoj književnosti (Slavonica in Varasdinensia)" [Milčetić's Assessment of Relković's Satir and M. A. Relković's Place in Croatian Literature (Slavonica in Varasdinensia)]. Zbornik o Ivanu Milčetiću, književnom povjesničaru, filologu i etnologu (PDF). Znanstveni zbornici (in Serbo-Croatian). Vol. 7. Zagreb: Hrvatski studiji Sveučilišta u Zagrebu. pp. 454–461. ISBN 953-6682-34-6.
- Brešić, Vinko (2002). "Milčetićevo poimanje književnih poslanica" [The Understanding of Literary Epistles by Andrija Milčetić]. Zbornik o Ivanu Milčetiću, književnom povjesničaru, filologu i etnologu (PDF). Znanstveni zbornici (in Serbo-Croatian). Vol. 7. Zagreb: Hrvatski studiji Sveučilišta u Zagrebu. pp. 447–451. ISBN 953-6682-34-6.
- Nikčević, Milorad (2002). "Kritički pogled Ivana Milčetića na književni rad Stefana Mitrova Ljubiše i književno stvaralaštvo u Boki kotorskoj" [The Critical Viewpoint of Ivan Milčetić on the Literary Work of Stefan Mitrov Ljubiša and the Literary Creativity in Boka Kotorska]. Zbornik o Ivanu Milčetiću, književnom povjesničaru, filologu i etnologu (PDF). Znanstveni zbornici (in Serbo-Croatian). Vol. 7. Zagreb: Hrvatski studiji Sveučilišta u Zagrebu. pp. 433–446. ISBN 953-6682-34-6.
- Kapraljević, Ana (2002). "Četvrt stoljeća djelovanja Ivana Milčetića u Viencu" [A Quarter Century of the Work of Ivan Milčetić in Vienac]. Zbornik o Ivanu Milčetiću, književnom povjesničaru, filologu i etnologu (PDF). Znanstveni zbornici (in Serbo-Croatian). Vol. 7. Zagreb: Hrvatski studiji Sveučilišta u Zagrebu. pp. 417–432. ISBN 953-6682-34-6.
- Mostarkić, Snježana (2002). "Korespondencija Milčetić — Jagić" [Correspondence Between Milčetić and Jagić]. Zbornik o Ivanu Milčetiću, književnom povjesničaru, filologu i etnologu (PDF). Znanstveni zbornici (in Serbo-Croatian). Vol. 7. Zagreb: Hrvatski studiji Sveučilišta u Zagrebu. pp. 403–416. ISBN 953-6682-34-6.
- Srdoč-Konestra, Ines (2002). "Milčetićev boravak u Rijeci (Milčetić i starija hrvatska književnost)" [Milčetić's Stay in Rijeka (Milčetić and older Croatian literature)]. Zbornik o Ivanu Milčetiću, književnom povjesničaru, filologu i etnologu (PDF). Znanstveni zbornici (in Serbo-Croatian). Vol. 7. Zagreb: Hrvatski studiji Sveučilišta u Zagrebu. pp. 389–402. ISBN 953-6682-34-6.
- Strčić, Petar (2002). "Otok Krk u Milčetićevo doba" [The Island of Krk in Milčetić's Time]. Zbornik o Ivanu Milčetiću, književnom povjesničaru, filologu i etnologu (PDF). Znanstveni zbornici (in Serbo-Croatian). Vol. 7. Zagreb: Hrvatski studiji Sveučilišta u Zagrebu. pp. 373–388. ISBN 953-6682-34-6.
- Dürrigl, Maria-Ana (2002). "Ivan Milčetić o najstarijoj hrvatskoglagoljskoj ljekaruši" [Ivan Milčetić on the Oldest Croatian Glagolitic Medicine Book]. Zbornik o Ivanu Milčetiću, književnom povjesničaru, filologu i etnologu (PDF). Znanstveni zbornici (in Serbo-Croatian). Vol. 7. Zagreb: Hrvatski studiji Sveučilišta u Zagrebu. pp. 365–372. ISBN 953-6682-34-6.
- Zaradija Kiš, Antonija (2002). "Ivan Milčetić (1853.–1921.) i Šimun Greblo (oko 1472.–1551.)" [Ivan Milčetić (Born 1853 – Died 1921) and Šimun Greblo (Born Aroun 1472 – Died 1551)]. Zbornik o Ivanu Milčetiću, književnom povjesničaru, filologu i etnologu (PDF). Znanstveni zbornici (in Serbo-Croatian). Vol. 7. Zagreb: Hrvatski studiji Sveučilišta u Zagrebu. pp. 357–364. ISBN 953-6682-34-6.
- Doliner, Gorana (2002). "Šibenska molitva: neke mogućnosti muzikološke interpretacije u povodu prvoga objavljivanja Ivana Milčetića i Jose Miloševića" [Šibenik Prayer: Some Insights into Musicological Interpretations Accompanying the First Publication of Ivan Milčetić and Joso Milošević]. Zbornik o Ivanu Milčetiću, književnom povjesničaru, filologu i etnologu (PDF). Znanstveni zbornici (in Serbo-Croatian). Vol. 7. Zagreb: Hrvatski studiji Sveučilišta u Zagrebu. pp. 347–356. ISBN 953-6682-34-6.
- Majer-Bobetko, Sanja (2002). "Glazbeno-publicistički i muzikološki opus Ivana Milčetića" [Musically-Journalistic and Musical Work of Ivan Milčetić]. Zbornik o Ivanu Milčetiću, književnom povjesničaru, filologu i etnologu (PDF). Znanstveni zbornici (in Serbo-Croatian). Vol. 7. Zagreb: Hrvatski studiji Sveučilišta u Zagrebu. pp. 329–346. ISBN 953-6682-34-6.
- Gobo, Tamara (2002). "Ivan Milčetić o hrvatskim demonološkim ili mitskim predajima" [Ivan Milčetić on Croatian Demonological and Mythological Tradition]. Zbornik o Ivanu Milčetiću, književnom povjesničaru, filologu i etnologu (PDF). Znanstveni zbornici (in Serbo-Croatian). Vol. 7. Zagreb: Hrvatski studiji Sveučilišta u Zagrebu. pp. 319–327. ISBN 953-6682-34-6.
- Banov, Estela (2002). "Ivan Milčetić o koledarskim pjesmama i običajima" [Ivan Milčetić on Carolling Songs and Customs]. Zbornik o Ivanu Milčetiću, književnom povjesničaru, filologu i etnologu (PDF). Znanstveni zbornici (in Serbo-Croatian). Vol. 7. Zagreb: Hrvatski studiji Sveučilišta u Zagrebu. pp. 309–317. ISBN 953-6682-34-6.
- Bacalja, Robert (2002). "Ivan Milčetić o Zanovićevim pjesmama" [Ivan Milčetić on Zanović's Poems]. Zbornik o Ivanu Milčetiću, književnom povjesničaru, filologu i etnologu (PDF). Znanstveni zbornici (in Serbo-Croatian). Vol. 7. Zagreb: Hrvatski studiji Sveučilišta u Zagrebu. pp. 299–308. ISBN 953-6682-34-6.
- Šišak, Marinko (2002). "Politička misao i djelovanje Ivana Milčetića" [Political Thought and Activity of Ivan Milčetić]. Zbornik o Ivanu Milčetiću, književnom povjesničaru, filologu i etnologu (PDF). Znanstveni zbornici (in Serbo-Croatian). Vol. 7. Zagreb: Hrvatski studiji Sveučilišta u Zagrebu. pp. 287–297. ISBN 953-6682-34-6.
- Vulić, Sanja (2002). "Milčetić i Hrvati na gradišćanskohrvatskom govornom području" [Milčetić and the Croats in the Burgenland Croatian Speech Area]. Zbornik o Ivanu Milčetiću, književnom povjesničaru, filologu i etnologu (PDF). Znanstveni zbornici (in Serbo-Croatian). Vol. 7. Zagreb: Hrvatski studiji Sveučilišta u Zagrebu. pp. 261–286. ISBN 953-6682-34-6.
- Zubčić, Sanja (2002). "Neizravan dijalektološki rad Ivana Milčetića" [The Indirect Dialectological Work of Ivan Milčetić]. Zbornik o Ivanu Milčetiću, književnom povjesničaru, filologu i etnologu (PDF). Znanstveni zbornici (in Serbo-Croatian). Vol. 7. Zagreb: Hrvatski studiji Sveučilišta u Zagrebu. pp. 245–259. ISBN 953-6682-34-6.
- Rišner, Vlasta (2002). "O jeziku Milčetića" [On Milčetić's Language]. Zbornik o Ivanu Milčetiću, književnom povjesničaru, filologu i etnologu (PDF). Znanstveni zbornici (in Serbo-Croatian). Vol. 7. Zagreb: Hrvatski studiji Sveučilišta u Zagrebu. pp. 231–243. ISBN 953-6682-34-6.
- Ham, Sanda (2002). "Milčetićevi pogledi na jezična zbivanja 19. stoljeća" [Milčetić's Views on Language Activities in the 19th Century]. Zbornik o Ivanu Milčetiću, književnom povjesničaru, filologu i etnologu (PDF). Znanstveni zbornici (in Serbo-Croatian). Vol. 7. Zagreb: Hrvatski studiji Sveučilišta u Zagrebu. pp. 217–230. ISBN 953-6682-34-6.
- Zvonar, Ivan (2002). "Ivan Milčetić i kantorska spričavanja". Zbornik o Ivanu Milčetiću, književnom povjesničaru, filologu i etnologu (PDF). Znanstveni zbornici (in Serbo-Croatian). Vol. 7. Zagreb: Hrvatski studiji Sveučilišta u Zagrebu. pp. 189–215. ISBN 953-6682-34-6.
  - Republished in Na kajkavskim korijenima: rasprave i studije [At the Kajkavian Roots: Debates and Papers] (in Serbo-Croatian). Samobor: Meridijani. 2009. ISBN 978-953-239-108-4.
- Mihanović-Salopek, Hrvojka (2002). "Doprinos Ivana Milčetića proučavanju hrvatske crkvene himnodije" [The Contribution of Ivan Milčetić Towards the Study of Church Hymns]. Zbornik o Ivanu Milčetiću, književnom povjesničaru, filologu i etnologu (PDF). Znanstveni zbornici (in Serbo-Croatian). Vol. 7. Zagreb: Hrvatski studiji Sveučilišta u Zagrebu. pp. 177–188. ISBN 953-6682-34-6.
  - Republished in U ogledalu kritike [In the Mirror of Criticism] (in Serbo-Croatian). Zagreb: Udruga Prosoli. 2013. ISBN 9789535624936.
- Pšihistal, Ružica (2002). "Milčetićevo predavanje o Maruliću godine 1901.: prinos obljetnici / prinos marulologiji" [Milčetić's Lecture from 1901 on Marulić: A Contribution to the Anniversary/A Contribution to Marulology]. Zbornik o Ivanu Milčetiću, književnom povjesničaru, filologu i etnologu (PDF). Znanstveni zbornici (in Serbo-Croatian). Vol. 7. Zagreb: Hrvatski studiji Sveučilišta u Zagrebu. pp. 155–176. ISBN 953-6682-34-6.
- Nazor, Anica (2002a). "Milčetićev odnos prema ćirilici" [Milčetić's Relationship Towards Cyrillic Script]. Zbornik o Ivanu Milčetiću, književnom povjesničaru, filologu i etnologu (PDF). Znanstveni zbornici (in Serbo-Croatian). Vol. 7. Zagreb: Hrvatski studiji Sveučilišta u Zagrebu. pp. 149–153. ISBN 953-6682-34-6.
- Sapunar, Andrea (2002). "Milčetićev putopis o Hrvatima Moravske, Donje Austrije i zapadne Ugarske" [Milčetić's Travel Book on Croatians from Moravia, Lower Austria and Western Hungary]. Zbornik o Ivanu Milčetiću, književnom povjesničaru, filologu i etnologu (PDF). Znanstveni zbornici (in Serbo-Croatian). Vol. 7. Zagreb: Hrvatski studiji Sveučilišta u Zagrebu. pp. 135–148. ISBN 953-6682-34-6.
- Rados, Zvjezdana (2002). "Milčetić kao putopisac" [Ivan Milčetić as a Travel Writer]. Zbornik o Ivanu Milčetiću, književnom povjesničaru, filologu i etnologu (PDF). Znanstveni zbornici (in Serbo-Croatian). Vol. 7. Zagreb: Hrvatski studiji Sveučilišta u Zagrebu. pp. 121–134. ISBN 953-6682-34-6.
- Grbić Jakopović, Jadranka (2002). "Etnografsko-etnološki i folkloristički rad Ivana Milčetića" [Ethnographical and Ethnological Folklore Work by Ivan Milčetić]. Zbornik o Ivanu Milčetiću, književnom povjesničaru, filologu i etnologu (PDF). Znanstveni zbornici (in Serbo-Croatian). Vol. 7. Zagreb: Hrvatski studiji Sveučilišta u Zagrebu. pp. 113–119. ISBN 953-6682-34-6.
- Jembrih, Alojz (2002). "Milčetić o kajkavštini" [Ivan Milčetić on the Position of Croatian Kajkavian Dialect]. Zbornik o Ivanu Milčetiću, književnom povjesničaru, filologu i etnologu (PDF). Znanstveni zbornici (in Serbo-Croatian). Vol. 7. Zagreb: Hrvatski studiji Sveučilišta u Zagrebu. pp. 99–112. ISBN 953-6682-34-6.
- Botica, Stipe (2002). "Milčetić o Majamontijevu djelu" [Milčetić about Bajamontis Works]. Zbornik o Ivanu Milčetiću, književnom povjesničaru, filologu i etnologu (PDF). Znanstveni zbornici (in Serbo-Croatian). Vol. 7. Zagreb: Hrvatski studiji Sveučilišta u Zagrebu. pp. 89–98. ISBN 953-6682-34-6.
- Maštrović, Tihomir (2002). "Ivan Milčetić o Nikoli Tommaseu" [Ivan Milčetić on Nikola Tommaseo]. Zbornik o Ivanu Milčetiću, književnom povjesničaru, filologu i etnologu (PDF). Znanstveni zbornici (in Serbo-Croatian). Vol. 7. Zagreb: Hrvatski studiji Sveučilišta u Zagrebu. pp. 81–88. ISBN 953-6682-34-6.
- Bratulić, Josip (2002). "Ivan Milčetić o Ljudevitu Gaju i ilirskoj ideji u Hrvatskoj u prvoj polovici XIX. stoljeća" [Ivan Milčetić on Ljudevit Gaj and the Illyrian Idea in Croatia in the First Half of the 19th Century]. Zbornik o Ivanu Milčetiću, književnom povjesničaru, filologu i etnologu (PDF). Znanstveni zbornici (in Serbo-Croatian). Vol. 7. Zagreb: Hrvatski studiji Sveučilišta u Zagrebu. pp. 65–76. ISBN 953-6682-34-6.
- Šicel, Miroslav (2002). "Ivan Milčetić i književnost hrvatskoga narodnog preporoda" [Ivan Milčetić and the Literature of the Croatian National Renaissance]. Zbornik o Ivanu Milčetiću, književnom povjesničaru, filologu i etnologu (PDF). Znanstveni zbornici (in Serbo-Croatian). Vol. 7. Zagreb: Hrvatski studiji Sveučilišta u Zagrebu. pp. 59–64. ISBN 953-6682-34-6.
- Stojević, Milorad (2002). "Ivan Milčetić o hrvatskim renesansnim poslanicama" [Ivan Milčetić on Croatian Renaissance Epistles]. Zbornik o Ivanu Milčetiću, književnom povjesničaru, filologu i etnologu (PDF). Znanstveni zbornici (in Serbo-Croatian). Vol. 7. Zagreb: Hrvatski studiji Sveučilišta u Zagrebu. pp. 51–58. ISBN 953-6682-34-6.
- Kolumbić, Nikica (2002). "Milčetić o Marulićevim prethodnicima" [Milčetić on Marulić's Predecessors]. Zbornik o Ivanu Milčetiću, književnom povjesničaru, filologu i etnologu (PDF). Znanstveni zbornici (in Serbo-Croatian). Vol. 7. Zagreb: Hrvatski studiji Sveučilišta u Zagrebu. pp. 45–50. ISBN 953-6682-34-6.
- Олеговна Вялова, Светлана (2002). "Иван Милчетић — первый исследователь глаголических памятников собрания Ивана Берчића в Российской национальной библиотке в Петербурге" [Ivan Milčetić — The First Researcher of the Glagolitic Monuments of the Collection of Ivan Berčić in the Russian National Library in Petersburg]. Zbornik o Ivanu Milčetiću, književnom povjesničaru, filologu i etnologu (PDF). Znanstveni zbornici (in Serbo-Croatian). Vol. 7. Zagreb: Hrvatski studiji Sveučilišta u Zagrebu. pp. 39–44. ISBN 953-6682-34-6.
- Nazor, Anica (2002b). "Milčetićev opis tiskanih glagoljskih knjiga u petrogradskoj zbirci Ivana Berčića" [Milčetić's Description of Published Glagolitic Books in Ivan Berčić's Collection from Sankt Petersburg]. Zbornik o Ivanu Milčetiću, književnom povjesničaru, filologu i etnologu (PDF). Znanstveni zbornici (in Serbo-Croatian). Vol. 7. Zagreb: Hrvatski studiji Sveučilišta u Zagrebu. pp. 33–38. ISBN 953-6682-34-6.
- Aleksandrov-Pogačnik, Nina (2002). "Dosezi i granice filologije (Uz radove Ivana Milčetića)" [Levels and Ranges of Philology (About Ivan Milčetić's Work)]. Zbornik o Ivanu Milčetiću, književnom povjesničaru, filologu i etnologu (PDF). Znanstveni zbornici (in Serbo-Croatian). Vol. 7. Zagreb: Hrvatski studiji Sveučilišta u Zagrebu. pp. 27–32. ISBN 953-6682-34-6.
- Damjanović, Stjepan (2002). "Ivan Milčetić — istraživač hrvatskoga glagolizma" [Ivan Milčetić — A Researcher of Croatian Glagolitism]. Zbornik o Ivanu Milčetiću, književnom povjesničaru, filologu i etnologu (PDF). Znanstveni zbornici (in Serbo-Croatian). Vol. 7. Zagreb: Hrvatski studiji Sveučilišta u Zagrebu. pp. 9–25. ISBN 953-6682-34-6.
- Maštrović, Tihomil (2002). "Riječ urednika" [Word from the Editor]. Zbornik o Ivanu Milčetiću, književnom povjesničaru, filologu i etnologu (PDF). Znanstveni zbornici (in Serbo-Croatian). Vol. 7. Zagreb: Hrvatski studiji Sveučilišta u Zagrebu. pp. 5–6. ISBN 953-6682-34-6.
- Gašparović, Darko (2001-11-16). Ivan Milčetić o kazalištu. Znanstveni skup o Ivanu Milčetiću. Varaždin.
- Blasina-Miseri, Antonia (2001-04-20). Milčetićeve talijanske teme. Znanstveni skup o Ivanu Milčetiću. Malinska.
- Lipovčan, Srećko (2001-04-20). Polemika Milčetić - Strohal o hrvatskoj glagoljskoj književnosti. Znanstveni skup o Ivanu Milčetiću. Malinska.
- Bratulić, Josip (2001). "Ivan Milčetić i Branko Vodnik" [Ivan Milčetić and Branko Vodnik]. Zbornik o Branku Vodniku, književnom povjesničaru (PDF). Znanstveni zbornici (in Serbo-Croatian). Vol. 6. Hrvatski studiji Sveučilišta u Zagrebu. pp. 85–94. ISBN 953-6682-22-2.
- Zubčić-Bogović, Sanja (2000). "Izravan dijalektološki rad Ivana Milčetića". Zbornik radova s Međunarodnog znanstvenog skupa 3. Riječki filološki dani. pp. 59–73. ISBN 953-6104-02-4.
- Damjanović, Stjepan (2000). Filološki razgovori. Biblioteka Portreti. ISBN 953-169-046-4.
- Damjanović, Stjepan (1996-09-30). "Ivan Milčetić – istraživač hrvatskoga glagolizma" [Ivan Milčetić – A Researcher of Croatian Glagolitism]. Slovo: Časopis Staroslavenskog instituta (in Serbo-Croatian) (44–46): 353–371. ISSN 0583-6255.
- Damjanović, Stjepan (1993). "Ivan Milčetić". Portreti hrvatskih jezikoslovaca. Biblioteka Hrvatski radio. Vol. 5. Zagreb: Hrvatski radio. p. 129.
- Damjanović, Stjepan (1993). "Filološke polemike Ivana Milčetića". Filologija: časopis Razreda za filološke znanosti Hrvatske akademije znanosti i umjetnosti (20–21): 59–66. ISSN 0449-363X.
- Damjanović, Stjepan (1991-10-30). "Ivan Milčetić - jezikoslovac" [Ivan Milčetić - Linguist]. Senjski zbornik (in Serbo-Croatian) (18): 15–21. ISSN 0582-673X.
- Duplančić, Arsen (1984-12-31). "Sjećanja Ivana Milčetića na Split i Franu Bulića" [Ivan Milčetić's Recollections of Split and Frane Bulić]. Kulturna baština (in Serbo-Croatian) (15): 37–50. ISSN 0351-0557.
- Nikočević, Lidija (1984-12-01). "Život i djelo Ivana Milčetića" [The Life and Work of Ivan Milčetić]. Etnološka tribina (in Serbo-Croatian). 13–14 (6–7): 91–96.
- Musić, August (1923). "Ivan Milčetić". Ljetopis Jugoslavenske akademije znanosti i umjetnosti (in Serbo-Croatian). 38. JAZU: 77–106.
- Jagić, Vatroslav (1883). "Von Herrn Gymn.-Prof. Ivan Milčetić in Warasdin: O poslanicama XVI. vijeka u dubrovačko-dalmatinskoj periodi hrvatske književnosti". Archiv für slavische Philologie (in German). 7 (published 1884): 500–501.
