= Stipančević =

Stipančević is a Croatian surname, a patronymic of Stipan. Notable people with the surname include:

- Maja Stipančević (born 1994), Croatian footballer, sister of Valentina
- Valentina Stipančević (born 1992), Croatian footballer

== See also ==
- Stipanović
- Stipanić
