= Stjepan =

Stjepan is a Croatian masculine given name, variant of Stephen. Historically it was found among ijekavian South Slavs, and it was also used as a honorific.

In Croatia, the name Stjepan was among the top ten most common masculine given names in the decades up to 1969.

Notable people with the name include:

- Stjepan Držislav of Croatia (died c. 997), Croatian monarch
- Stjepan II of Croatia (died c. 1090), Croatian monarch
- Stjepan Svetoslavić (fl. 1050s), Croatian nobleman
- Stjepan Andrijašević (born 1967), Croatian footballer
- Stjepan Andrašić (1941–2025), Croatian journalist
- Stjepan Babić (1925–2021), Croatian linguist
- Stjepan Bobek (1923–2010), Croatian footballer
- Stjepan Božić (born 1974), Croatian boxer
- Stjepan Brodarić (c. 1480–1539), Croatian cleric
- Stjepan Deverić (born 1961), Croatian footballer
- Stjepan Damjanović (born 1946), Croatian linguist
- Stjepan Đureković (1926–1983), Croatian businessman
- Stjepan Filipović (1916–1942), Croatian partisan
- Stjepan Gomboš (1895–1975), Croatian architect
- Stjepan Gradić (1613–1683), Croatian polymath
- Stjepan Hauser (born 1986), Croatian cellist
- Stjepan Horvat (1895–1985), Croatian geodesist
- Stjepan Ivšić (1884–1962), Croatian linguist
- Stjepan Janić (born 1980), Croatian canoer
- Stjepan Jukić (born 1979), Croatian footballer
- Stjepan Kljuić (born 1939), Bosnian Croat politician
- Stjepan Kovačević (1841–1913), Croatian politician
- Stjepan Lamza (1940–2022), Croatian footballer
- Stjepan Mesić (born 1934), Croatian politician
- Stjepan Meštrović (born 1955), Croatian-American sociologist
- Stjepan Miletić (1868–1908), Croatian playwright, director, critic, and writer
- Stjepan Mitrov Ljubiša (1824–1878), Serbian-Montenegrin politician
- Stjepan Mohorovičić (1890–1980), Croatian physicist
- Stjepan Musulin (1885–1969), Croatian linguist
- Stjepan Perestegi (born 1973), Croatian canoer
- Stjepan Planić (1900–1980), Croatian architect
- Stjepan Poljak (born 1983), Croatian footballer
- Stjepan Radić (1871–1928), Croatian politician
- Stjepan Sarkotić (1858–1939), Croatian soldier
- Stjepan Spevec (1858–1939), Croatian educator
- Stjepan Šejić (born 1981), Croatian comic book artist
- Stjepan Šiber (1938–2016), Army of the Republic of Bosnia and Herzegovina of Croat origin
- Stjepan Šulek (1914–1986), Croatian composer
- Stjepan Tomas (born 1976), Croatian footballer
- Stjepan Vrbančić (1900–1988), Croatian footballer
- Stjepan Vukčić Kosača (1404–1466), Bosnian nobleman

== See also ==
- Stipan
- Stipe
- Stjepanović
