= Stipe =

Stipe may refer to:

- Stipe (surname), including a list of people with the name
- Stipe (given name), including a list of people with the name
- Stipe (botany), a stalk that supports some other structure
- Stipe (mycology), a stem or stalk-like feature supporting the cap of a mushroom
- Stipe (graptolite), a branch of a fossilized graptolite colony
