= Bratulić =

Bratulić is a Croatian surname. The surname may refer to:

- Josip Bratulić (born 1939), Croatian philologist and a historian of literature and culture
- Šimun Bratulić (1550–1611), Croatian bishop
- Vjekoslav Bratulić (1911–1995), Croatian historian
