= Stipanović =

Stipanović is a surname found among the Croats, and more rarely among the Serbs. It is a patronymic of the name Stipan. The anglicized form is Stipanovich.

Notable people with the surname include:

- Andrija Stipanović (born 1986), Bosnian-Herzegovinian basketball player
- Dušan Stipanović (born 1956), Serbian politician
- Tonči Stipanović (born 1986), Croatian sailor
- Predrag Stipanović (born 1964), Croatian admiral

== See also ==
- Stipanić
- Stipančević
