= Milčetić =

Milčetić, sometimes spelled Milcetic, is a surname. Notable people with the surname include:

- Ivan Milčetić (1853–1921), Slavicist
- Jelena Ana Milcetic (born 1929), vocalist
