= Hercigonja =

Hercigonja is a surname. The Croatian census of 2011 listed it as one of the most common surnames in Tuhelj.

Notable people with the surname include:

- Eduard Hercigonja, a Croatian philologist and literary historian
- Helenna Hercigonja-Moulton, an American-born Croatian footballer
