= Ivan Milčetić =

Croatian slavicist (1853–1921)

Ivan Milčetić Matina
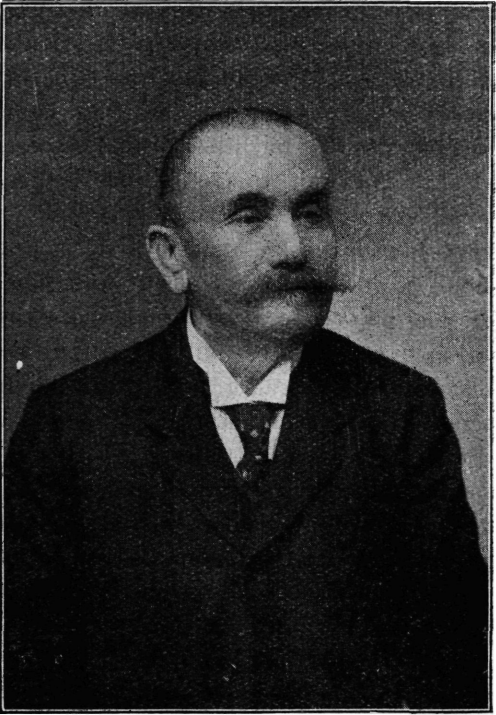
- Born: 27 August 1853; Milčetići, Croatia
- Died: 25 October 1921 (aged 68); Varaždin
- Education: (Discipline)
- Parents: Ivan (father); Helena (mother)
- Writings: see below

Signature
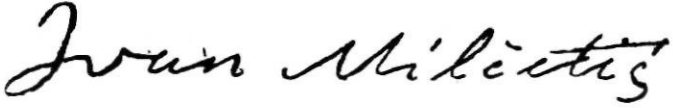

Ivan Milčetić Matina (27 August 1853 – 26 October 1921) was a Croatian Glagolitic philologist and literary historian from the island of Krk, with significant contributions to its dialectology, ethnology and folkloristics. He sometimes wrote under the pseudonym Zagorac.

== Early life ==
Ivan Milčetić was born in Milčetići to parents Ivan and Helena. He began his primary school education in Dubašnica, but finished it in the vicinity of Pazin, continuing at the Rijeka Gymnasium. At Rijeka, one of his professors was Tadija Smičiklas, who had a strong influence on him.

About his acquaintance with the Glagolitic script, Milčetić wrote, "Glagolitism blossomed on Krk, and even in my house." (Note: "Glagolizam je cvao na Krku, pa i u mojoj kući.")

In his youth, Milčetić was a member of the Hrvatska čitaonica in Bogovići.

He was a subscriber of the Hrvatski Dom student society in 1877–1878.

After studying Slavistics in Prague and Zagreb, Milčetić found employment at the Zagreb Gymnasium.

When Milčetić was a university student, he did not return to his father's home, not being allowed to, but that of his poorer brother-in-law, but after a feud with his brother Mate over a college loan he stopped returning to Dubašnica except for one time with his wife in 1893 or 1894.

Some monks mistakenly believed that Milčetić became rich off his publications, and on one occasion had to return a manuscript before he could study it to a monk, who exclaimed "the brothers remain poor, while others enrich themselves". (Note: "Fratri ostaju siromsi, a drugi se obogaćuju") In reality, for his Hrvatski lucidar, Milčetić was paid 214 krone and 60 heller by the Yugoslav Academy of Arts and sciences, of which Milčetić gave 20 krone to Branko Drechsler, 10 to P. Petris, using the rest for teaching-related travels to Graz and Prague, and for the purchase of some works he needed.

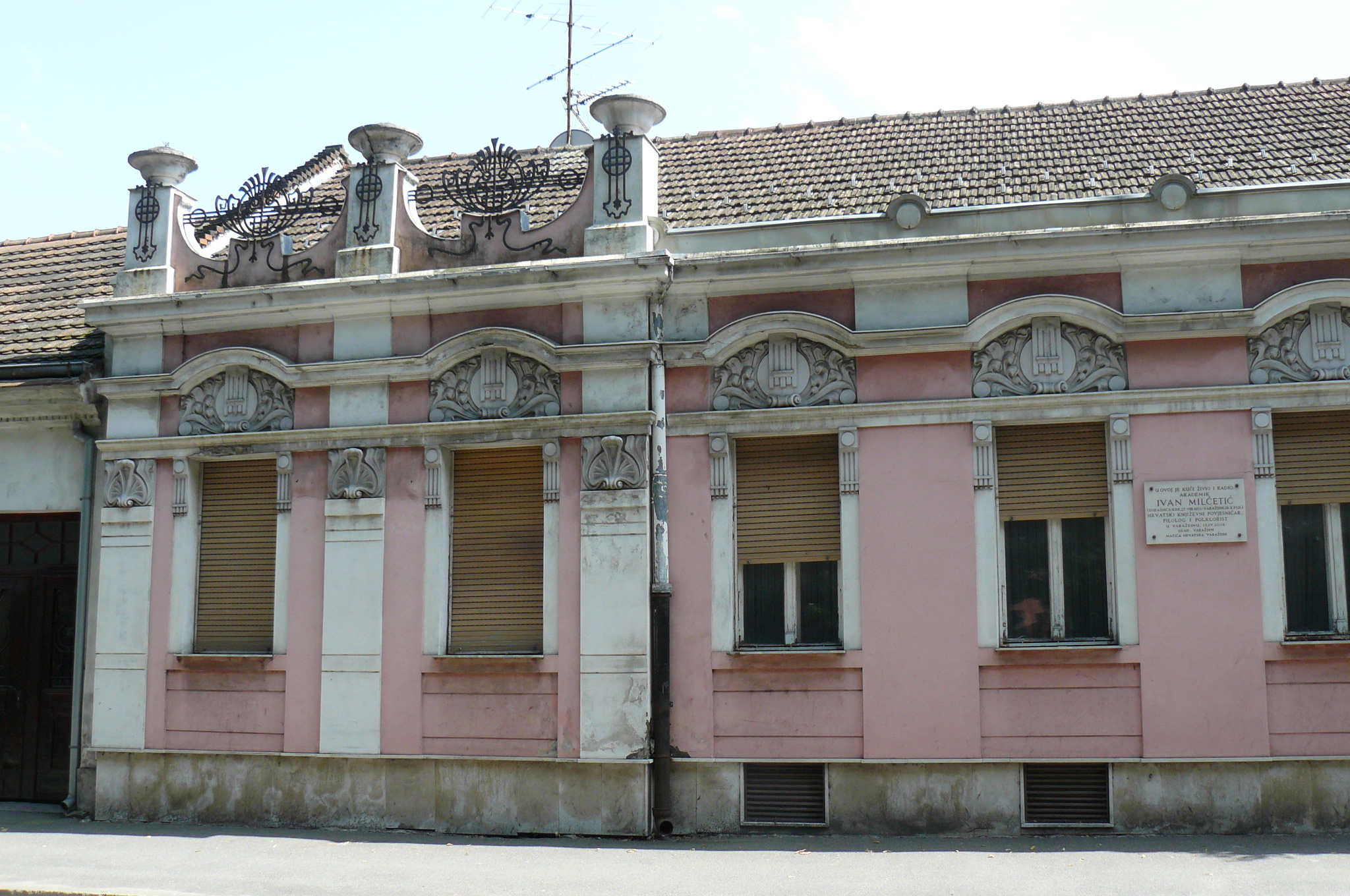
House of Ivan Milčetić in Varaždin, with Art Nouveau decorations

Shortly after, he moved to Varaždin, where he met Štefanija Lendvaj, daughter of Varaždin residents Stjepan and Terezija Schleicher. At the age of 30 he married the 19 year old Štefanija in Saint Nicholas church on 8 May 1886, with his gymnasium coworker Franjo Pongračić and lawyer Pavao Čepulo as witnesses. Mijo Mužina, parish priest of Beli (later of Dubašnica), was the officiating priest.

In Varaždin he began a family and where he remained until his death.

In 1893, he became a corresponding member of the Yugoslav Academy of Sciences and Arts.

He remained a paying member of the Old Church Slavonic Academy, although he was not a patron.

In 1909, he submitted a publication proposal to Matica hrvatska for a monograph Istria, Her Past and Present (Serbo-Croatian: Istra, njezina prošlost i sadašnjost), which he never completed thanks to the outbreak of WWI.

== Glagolitic bibliography ==
In the years leading up to and including the publication of the first part of his annotated library catalog of Glagolitic manuscripts Hrvatska glagoļska bibliografija in 1911, he was heavily preoccupied with manuscript collection and description. This first half he divided into 13 sections: missals, breviaries, psalters, lectionaries, ritualaria, fragments, partial liturgical books, works of theology, varia (especially miscellanies), homilies, history and law, verses and lexicon and grammar.

In his review of the bibliography, Vatroslav Jagić described it as a "very important if somewhat impenetrable work" that "opens the doors wide after the very incomplete bibliography of Kukuljević to the rich treasury of old Croatian Glagolitic literacy". (Note: "Ovo vrlo važno i ako nešto nepregledno djelo, otvara nam nakon vrlo površne bibliografije Kukuljevićeve širom vrata u bogatu riznicu stare hrvatske glagolske pismenosti.")

== Use of Cyrillic ==
Milčetić followed the example of the likes of Kopitar, Jagić, Miklosich, Rački, Vondrák and others in transcribing Glagolitic text with Cyrillic. This was primarily for practical reasons. It was both difficult to print Glagolitic text with the limited fonts available, and difficult to read for the majority even of specialists in the field of Slavistics, who rarely know Glagolitic. Miklosich himself found it slower, although his main reason was to increase readership. Ivan Črnčić preferred Latinic, employing the mixture of Latinic and Cyrillic used by Miklosich in his grammatical works. In his Hrvatska glagoļska bibliografija, Milčetić acknowledged the prevalence of Latinic, though he usually stressed there were a hundred million literate in Cyrillic. He pointed out that Cyrillic was capable of transliterating Glagolitic without modification or debate about correct orthography. Nevertheless, he opted for Latinic in his transcription of younger, generally marginal notes.

One contemporary influence on Milčetić's decision to use Cyrillic was an admiration for the continued publication of texts from Serbian manuscripts by the Yugoslav Academy of Arts and Sciences, mainly by Vatroslav Jagić and Stojan Novaković. Since the death of Ivan Berčić and departure of Jagić abroad, Glagolitic was seldom used in the transcription of such texts.

In his Hrvatska glagoļska bibliografija, Milčetić promised to include in the appendix to the second part a catalogue and description of the Cyrillic manuscripts in the area. But WWI arrested future work on the catalogue, and such a catalogue of Cyrillic manuscripts in the Adriatic Littoral still does not exist. Despite that, he always transcribed Cyrillic marginal notes where he found them. His decision to include notes of both scripts set an important precedent for future descriptions.

In Cyrillic there is something originally Slavic, so as we do not lightly abandon our inherited Slavic customs, we cannot but look with some piety on Cyrillic as well, which was dear to our grandfathers, and therefore cannot be hated by us either. (Note: "U ćirilici ima nešto originalno slavensko, pa kako se lako ne odričemo svojih baštinjenih slavenskih običaja, ne možemo, a da ne gledamo s nekim pietetom i na ćirilicu koja bješe mila našim djedovima, pa ne može da bude ni nama mrska.")

— Ivan Milčetić, Hrvatska glagoļska bibliografija (1911)

=== Debate with Mužina ===
With a polemic written on 24 June 1903 and published anonymously in Naša sloga on 9 July, Milčetić's former friend Mijo Mužina, that Milčetić had not published more of Paval Bogović's chronicle, accusing Milčetić of not returning it when asked. Milčetić did return it, however, to his friend Pavao Milovčić, catechist in Dubašica, parish priest of Dubašnica, started a public dispute with him after refusing to read the Hrvatski lucidar he sent him because its Glagolitic text had been transcribed in Cyrillic. To an extent, the two had fallen out with one another earlier. Milčetić claimed it was because of a financial question, whereas Mužina claimed it was because of things he wrote about his brother Jura Mužina in some "books". As recently as 1896, Mužina had assisted Milčetić with his Ženidbeni običaji, but Mužina had become frustrated with him over a matter concerning the chronicle of Paval Bogović-Šimov in 1897. (Note: Mužina) It was not enough to sour their relationship, however, so Milčetić sent Mužina a copy of his Hrvatski lucidar not long before Mužina published his polemic. In it, he related the death of Paval Bogović-Šimov, (Note: The subject of an 1880 article published by Milčetić in Naša sloga.) exalting the villager turned chronicler him for his equal literacy in Glagolitic and Latinic. Mužina accused Milčetić of taking a manuscript from him and never returning it, causing Bogović some distress. At length, he then criticised Milčetić's use of Cyrillic in its transcription, and his use of terms other than "Croatian" to describe its language, such as "Slavic".

Milčetić defended his use of Cyrillic in transcription as adherence to the scientific norm at the time, employing Miklosich's 1874 defence of his own use of Cyrillic in transcription, justifying it over Glagolitic because few scholars could read Glagolitic and because the Cyrillic typefaces available allowed for more accurate transcription than Glagolitic. Then he pointed out the irony of Mužina, still anonymous, refusing to read Cyrillic when Bogović himself was known to have been literate in Cyrillic. Milčetić recalled an occasion from around 1870 when he and Mužina's older brother Josip had returned home from afar with a Serbian book, (Note: The book had been given to Josip Mužina by a certain Bokelj.) which Milčetić made fun of when he saw Cyrillic, only to be reprimanded by the elder Mužina, "but that is our language!" (Serbo-Croatian: tr je to naš jezik!). He decried Mužina's selectivity in referring to him as a "thief" of documents from Krk for borrowing them when both Ivan Kukuljević Sakcinski and Martin Štiglić had done so from Dubašnica, in addition to Ivan Berčić, Ivan Črnčić, and Dragutin Parčić.

In a response dated 30 August 1903 and published in Naša sloga, Mužina began with personal attacks, but eventually defended himself from the accusation of hating Cyrillic, paying his respect to it inasmuch as it was used by Croats, but continuing to arguing Milčetić ought to have transcribed Glagolitic text in Glagolitic, unaware of the deficiencies of the Glagolitic typefaces available. In contrast to his brief defence of Cyrillic, Mužina asked Milčetić rhetorically why he called the language of Cyrillic books "ours" (Serbo-Croatian: naš) and not "Croatian", accusing him of clumsily using of "Serbian" in reference to the Cyrillic book his older brother had brought home, but just after adducing to his arguments against Cyrillic the "treacherous actions of certain Serbs against us Croats" (Note: "izdajničko postupanje stanovitih Srba proti nam Hrvatom") (reflecting his views on the events surrounding Zagreb revolt), and later passionately expressing his frustration with the use of terms like "Slavic", "Yugoslav", "Glagolitic", "Serbian", "Serbo-Croatian", "Naški", and others instead of "Croatian" as he was taught in school to call it and as his mother called it. (Note: "Ne, ja nikoga nemrzim, a još manje braću Slavene; ja mrzim (al ne osobe nego njihove zle čine) iskopajnika sreće moga naroda i izroda svakoga, a i onoga koji silom nameće nekaki drugi naziv, nekako drugo ime, momu milomu hrvatskomu jeziku, koga ste već prozvali i ilirskim, i slavnskim, i jugoslavenskim, i glagljskim, i srbskim i srbsko-hrvatskim, i našim i naškim, i slovinskim, a najmanje hrvatskim: dočim ja ga nemogu drugčije zvati nego hrvatskim, jer sam čuo da ga je tako zvala moja majka, e učio sam i u školah da se tako zove.") Mužina himself learned Glagolitic in 7th and 8th grade in Rijeka, and again for 3 years at the Diocesan Seminary in Zadar, and to have sung his First Mass from a Glagolitic missal in 1873, then "almost always" (Note: "od onda uviek ili reći ću skoro uviek čitam sv. misu u starohrv. jeziku — pop sam glagoljaš") thereafter, claiming to have written his parish register entries in Glagolitic in all three parishes he served in (Poljica, Beli, Dubašnica) until he beginning of the 20th century. Since the editor refused to publish a rebutal, the public debate ended there.

== Political views ==
Milčetić donated 10 krone to Naša sloga in December 1905.

== Death ==
He died 27 August 1921 and was buried in Varaždin, predeceasing his older contemporary Vatroslav Jagić, who as a native of Varaždin was also buried there when he himself died just short (Note: 708 days after the death of Milčetić) of 2 years later.

== Library ==
His personal library included a number of rare books, such as a copy of Jurij Dalmatin's Agenda, now kept at the Library of the Croatian Academy of Arts and Sciences as R-1430, along with the Dil drugij Katekisma od gliubavi i od X. zapovydyh, as well as of Pavao Posilović's Cviet ot kriposti duhovni i tilesnie.

Select books owned by Milčetić:

- Anonymous, Istro, čuj naš glas!
- Ignacije Bakotić's I partiti in Dalmazia
- Kvirin Bonefačić's Dragutin A. Parčić
- Franjo Marković's Iz mladih dana: pjesme izvorne i prevedene
- Josip Martinolić's Giovanni Fiamin
- Johannes Frischauf's Auf Cherso
- Vatroslav Jagić's Gramatika jezika hèrvatskoga
- Dositej Obradović's Ezopove i pročih raznih basnotvorcev basne
- Armin Pavić's translation of Aristotle's Poetica
- Mihovil Pavlinović's Hrvatski razgovori
- Pavle Solarić's Букварь Славенскїй тріазбучный
- Milivoj Šrepel's Akcenat i metar junačkih narodnih pjesama

== Legacy ==
A bust of made by sculptor Ratko Petrić was commissioned by the Varaždin chapter of Matica hrvatska and given to the Malinska-Dubašnica chapter of Matica hrvatska, who placed it in front of the Kuća dubašljanske baštine.

Stjepan Damjanović called him "one of those activists in the research of glagolitism whose name will be mentioned as long as glagolitism itself". (Note: "... jedan od onih pregalaca u proučavanju glagoljaštva čije će se ime spominjati dok i glagoljaštvo samo".)

== Remains ==
He left a diary.

== Select works ==
- "Putne crtice iz Boke i Crne Gore" [Travel Outlines from Boka and Crna Gora]. Vienac: zabavi i pouci (in Serbo-Croatian). Vol. VIII. 1876. Issues 25, 26, 30, 31, 33, 36, 38, 41, 45.
- "Kratka povijest književnosti hrvatske i srpske od I. Filipovića" [A Brief History of Croatian and Serbian Literature from I. Filipović]. Vienac: zabavi i pouci (in Serbo-Croatian). Vol. VIII, no. 1–3. 1876.
- "Stanislav Sočivica". Vienac: zabavi i pouci (in Serbo-Croatian). Vol. X, no. 4–7. 1878.
- Hrvati od Gaja do godine 1850: Kulturno-istorijski i književni pregled [Croats from Gaj to the Year 1850: Cultural-Historical and Literary Overview] (in Serbo-Croatian). Zagreb: Dionička tiskara. 1878.
- "Jesu li naši kajkavci Hrvati" [Are Our Kajkavians Croats]. Vienac: zabavi i pouci (in Serbo-Croatian). Vol. XII, no. 4–11. 1880.
- "Relković u hrvatskoj književnosti" [Relković in Croatian Literature]. Vienac: zabavi i pouci (in Serbo-Croatian). Vol. XIII, no. 29–33. 1881.
- O poslanicama u dubrovačko-dalmatinskoj periodi hrvatske literature [On Letters in the Dubrovnik-Dalmatia Period of Croatian Literature] (in Serbo-Croatian). Varaždin: Brzotisak Platzera sina. 1882.
- "O novom izdanju hrvatskih liturgičkih knjiga" [On the New Edition of Croatian Liturgical Books]. Vienac: zabavi i pouci (in Serbo-Croatian). Vol. XV, no. 16–18. 1883.
- "S otoka Cresa" [From the Island of Cres]. Vienac: zabavi i pouci (in Serbo-Croatian). Vol. XVII, no. 29–32. 1885.
- "Krčki knezovi i predaje o njima" [The Lords of Krk and Folktales About Them]. Vienac: zabavi i pouci (in Serbo-Croatian). Vol. XVI. 1884. Issues 20, 22, 23.
- "Arkeologično-istorične crtice s hrvatskih otoka" [Archaeological-Historical Outlines from Croatian Islands]. Vjestnik Kr. hrvatsko-slavonsko-dalmatinskog zemaljskog arkiva (in Serbo-Croatian). 6 (6): 18–28, 50–55, 80–85, 105–116. 1884-09-11. ISSN 0350-7165.
- "O Andriji Jambrešiću" [On Andrija Jambrešić]. Vienac: zabavi i pouci (in Serbo-Croatian). Vol. XIX. 1887. Issues 10–13, 15.
- "O životu i književnom radu Nikole Tommasea". Iskrice [On the Life and Literary Work of Nikola Tommaseo] (in Serbo-Croatian) (4th ed.). Zagreb: Matica hrvatska. 1888. pp. VII–LXXVIII.
- "Prilozi za literaturu hrvatskih glagolskih spomenika: Ivančićev zbornik" [Contributions to the Literature of Croatian Glagolitic Monuments: Ivančić's Miscellany]. Starine Jugoslavenske akademije znanosti i umjetnosti (in Serbo-Croatian). 23. Zagreb: JAZU: 40–79. 1890.
- "Prilozi za literaturu hrvatskih glagolskih spomenika: Još jedna rijetka glagolska tiskana kńiga" [Contributions to the Literature of Croatian Glagolitic Monuments: Another Rare Glagolitic Printed Book]. Starine Jugoslavenske akademije znanosti i umjetnosti (in Serbo-Croatian). 23. Zagreb: JAZU: 84–153. 1890.
- "Prilozi za literaturu hrvatskih glagoljskih spomenika: Zakon brašćine svetoga duha u Baški" [Contributions to the Literature of Croatian Glagolitic Monuments: The Law of the Brotherhood of the Holy Spirit in Baška]. Starine Jugoslavenske akademije znanosti i umjetnosti (in Serbo-Croatian). 25: 138–151. 1892.
- "Čakavština Kvarnerskih otoka" [The Chakavian Dialect of the Kvarner Islands]. Rad Jugoslavenske akademije znanosti i umjetnosti: Filologičko-historički i filosofičko-juridički razredi (in Serbo-Croatian). 42. JAZU: 92–131. 1895.
- "O Moravskim Hrvatima" [On the Moravian Croats]. Vienac: zabavi i pouci (in Serbo-Croatian). Vol. XXX. 1898. Issues 30–32, 34, 36.
- O hrvatskim naseobinama u Moravskoj, Donjoj Austriji i Zapadnoj Ugarskoj: Narodopisne crtice. Zagreb: Dionička tiskara. 1899.
- "Prilozi za literaturu hrvatskih glagoljskih spomenika: Hrvatski lucidar" [Contributions to the Literature of Croatian Glagolitic Monuments: The Croatian Lucidarium]. Starine Jugoslavenske akademije znanosti i umjetnosti (in Serbo-Croatian). 30: 257–334. 1902.
- "Isprave za odnošaj Dubrovnika prema Veneciji" [Documents for the Relationship of Dubrovnik Towards Venice]. Starine Jugoslavenske akademije znanosti i umjetnosti (in Serbo-Croatian). 30. Zagreb: JAZU: 335–352. 1902.
- "Duhovne i šaljive pjesme iz Makarske" [Spiritual and Comical Songs from Makarska]. Građa za povijest književnosti hrvatske (in Serbo-Croatian). 5: 148–267. 1907.
- "Paprike harvatske leta 1846" [Paprike harvatske of the Year 1846]. Građa za povijest književnosti hrvatske (in Serbo-Croatian). 5: 118–138. 1907.
- "Šulekova pisma I. Trnskom" [Šulek's Letters to I. Trnski]. Građa za povijest književnosti hrvatske (in Serbo-Croatian). 5: 278–292. 1907.
- "Prethodni izvještaj o izučavanju hrvatske glagoljske književnosti". Ljetopis Jugoslavenske akademije znanosti i umjetnosti (in Serbo-Croatian). 23. JAZU: 169–200. 1908.
- "Hrvatska glagoļska bibliografija: Dio I" [Croatian Glagolitic Bibliography: Part I]. Starine Jugoslavenske akademije znanosti i umjetnosti (in Serbo-Croatian). 33. Zagreb: JAZU: 1–505. 1911.
- "Dr. Julije Bajamonti i ńegova djela" [Dr. Julije Bajamonti and His Works]. Rad Jugoslavenske akademije znanosti i umjetnosti: Filologičko-historički i filosofičko-juridički razredi (in Serbo-Croatian). 54. JAZU: 97–250. 1912.
- "Pop Ivan Feretić, krčki istorik (1769–1839)" [Priest Ivan Feretić, Krk Historian (1769–1839)]. Građa za povijest književnosti hrvatske (in Serbo-Croatian). 7: 329–361. 1912.
- ""Della storia civile e cronologica della terra sive castello di Lossin Grande nella Dalmazia, ventilata nell' anno 1791": Napisao lošinjski bilježnik Martin Botterini". Ljetopis Jugoslavenske akademije znanosti i umjetnosti (in Serbo-Croatian). 30. JAZU: 23–44. 1915.
- "Dva zaboravlena kńiževnika iz Kaštela" [Two Forgotten Writers from Kaštela]. Građa za povijest književnosti hrvatske (in Serbo-Croatian). 8: 181–204. 1916.
- "Hrvatski kńiževni prilozi iz Međumurja i okolice grada Šoprona: Jedan hrvatski preporoditel iz Međumurja" [Croatian Literary Contributions from Međimurje and the Environs of the City of Šopron: A Croatian Enlightener from Međimurje]. Građa za povijest književnosti hrvatske (in Serbo-Croatian). 8: 395–439. 1916.
- "Hrvatski kńiževni prilozi iz Međumurja i okolice grada Šoprona: K hrvatskoj pučkoj literaturi u Međimurju i oko Šoprona" [Croatian Literary Contributions from Međimurje and the Environs of the City of Šopron: On Croatian Folk Literature in Međimurje and Around Šopron]. Građa za povijest književnosti hrvatske (in Serbo-Croatian). 5: 439–461. 1916.
- "Matije Sovića predgovor "Slavenskoj gramatici"" [Matija Sović's Introduction to "Slavenska gramatika"]. Starine Jugoslavenske akademije znanosti i umjetnosti (in Serbo-Croatian). 35. Zagreb: JAZU: 369–425. 1916.
- "Koleda u južnih Slavena: na osnovi istoričkih vijesti, narodnih pjesama i običaja našega vremena". Zbornik za narodni život i običaje Južnih Slavena (in Serbo-Croatian). 22. JAZU: 1–124. 1917.
- Štefanić, Vjekoslav, ed. (1955-11-30). "Berčićeva zbirka glagoljskih rukopisa i štampanih knjiga u Lenjingradu" [Berčić's Collection of Glagolitic Manuscripts and Printed Books in Leningrad]. Radovi Staroslavenskog instituta (in Serbo-Croatian). 2 (2). Zagreb: 93–128. Posthumous.

== Bibliography ==
- HAZU (2025o). "Iz mladih dana: pjesme izvorne i prevedene". Digitalna zbirka i katalog Hrvatske akademije znanosti i umjetnosti (in Serbo-Croatian). Archived from the original on 2025-07-11.
- HAZU (2025n). "Istro, čuj naš glas!". Digitalna zbirka i katalog Hrvatske akademije znanosti i umjetnosti (in Serbo-Croatian). Archived from the original on 2025-07-11.
- HAZU (2025m). "I partiti in Dalmazia". Digitalna zbirka i katalog Hrvatske akademije znanosti i umjetnosti (in Serbo-Croatian). Archived from the original on 2025-07-11.
- HAZU (2025l). "Hrvatski razgovori". Digitalna zbirka i katalog Hrvatske akademije znanosti i umjetnosti (in Serbo-Croatian). Archived from the original on 2025-07-11.
- HAZU (2025k). "Giovanni Fiamin". Digitalna zbirka i katalog Hrvatske akademije znanosti i umjetnosti (in Serbo-Croatian). Archived from the original on 2025-07-11.
- HAZU (2025j). "Esopove i pročih' raznih' basnotvorcev' so različni ezika na slavenoserbski ezik' prevedene ... i serbskoj junosti posvećene basne". Digitalna zbirka i katalog Hrvatske akademije znanosti i umjetnosti (in Serbo-Croatian). Archived from the original on 2025-07-10.
- HAZU (2025i). "Dragutin A. Parčić: 26. V.1832. - 25. XII.1902". Digitalna zbirka i katalog Hrvatske akademije znanosti i umjetnosti (in Serbo-Croatian). Archived from the original on 2025-07-10.
- HAZU (2025h). "Dio 1 : Glasovi". Digitalna zbirka i katalog Hrvatske akademije znanosti i umjetnosti (in Serbo-Croatian). Archived from the original on 2025-07-10.
- HAZU (2025g). "Dil drugij Katekisma od gliubavi i od X. zapovydyh". Digitalna zbirka i katalog Hrvatske akademije znanosti i umjetnosti (in Serbo-Croatian). Archived from the original on 2025-07-10.
- HAZU (2025f). "Cviet ot kriposti duhovni i tilesnie prikoristan svakomu virnomu karstianinu koi ga šti često". Digitalna zbirka i katalog Hrvatske akademije znanosti i umjetnosti (in Serbo-Croatian). Archived from the original on 2025-07-10.
- HAZU (2025e). "Bukvár' slavénskij triazbučnyj, ili pervoe rukovódstvo k poznániju knig' i pisanij, vo upotreblénie Slaveno-Serbov spisán' Pavlom' Solaričem'". Digitalna zbirka i katalog Hrvatske akademije znanosti i umjetnosti (in Serbo-Croatian). Archived from the original on 2025-07-10.
- HAZU (2025d). "Auf Cherso". Digitalna zbirka i katalog Hrvatske akademije znanosti i umjetnosti (in Serbo-Croatian). Archived from the original on 2025-07-10.
- HAZU (2025c). "Aristotelova Poetika". Digitalna zbirka i katalog Hrvatske akademije znanosti i umjetnosti (in Serbo-Croatian). Archived from the original on 2025-07-10.
- HAZU (2025b). "Akcenat i metar junačkih narodnih pjesama: rasprava odobrena povjerenstvom strogih ispita fakulteta mudroslovnoga". Digitalna zbirka i katalog Hrvatske akademije znanosti i umjetnosti (in Serbo-Croatian). Archived from the original on 2025-07-10.
- HAZU (2025a). "Agenda, tu ie, koku se te imenitishe Boshie slushbe opravlajo po Wirtemberski cerkovni ordnungi, slovenski = Wirtembergische Kirchenagend, Windisch". Digitalna zbirka i katalog Hrvatske akademije znanosti i umjetnosti (in Serbo-Croatian). Archived from the original on 2025-07-10.
- Šimić, Ana (2021). "Prvi se pamte – noćni istraživač Ivan Milčetić". Žgombićev zbornik. Archived from the original on 2021-04-14.
- Botica, Ivan; Galović, Tomislav (2014). "Darovnica Ivana VII. Frankapana – najstarija je dubašljanska glagoljična isprava" [The Grant of Ivan VII. Frankopan - The Oldest Glagolitic Document from Dubašnica]. Krčki kalendar (in Serbo-Croatian) (published 2015): 86–92.
- n.s. (2013). "Milčetić, Ivan". Hrvatska enciklopedija, mrežno izdanje. Leksikografski zavod Miroslav Krleža.
- Banov-Depope, Estela (2011). "Ivan Milčetić o koledarskim pjesmama i običajima". Zvuci i znaci: Interkulturalne i intermedijalne kroatističke studije [Ivan Milčetić on Carolling Songs and Traditions] (in Serbo-Croatian). Leykam International. pp. 147–158. ISBN 978-953-7534-72-1.
- Lukić, Milica (2010). "Polemike oko jezika i pisma liturgijskih staroslavenskih knjiga u 19. stoljeću, s osobitim obzirom na tekstove Dragutina Antuna Parčića i Ivana Milčetića". Knjige poštujući, knjigama poštovan: Zbornik o 70. rođendanu Josipa Bratulića [Polemics About the Language and Script of Old Slavonic Liturgical Books in the 19th Century, With Reference to the Texts of Dragutin Antun Parčić and Ivan Milčetić] (in Serbo-Croatian). Zagreb: Matica hrvatska. pp. 283–292. ISBN 978-953-150-906-0.
- Babić, Vanda (2009). Putopisne refleksije Ivana Milčetića o Crnoj Gori, P. P. Njegošu i I. Mažuraniću. Međunarodni i međudržavni (RH-CG) znanstveni skup "Dani Ivana Mažuranića (1814.-1890.)" Cetinje, Crna Gora.
- Grbić, Jadranka (2006-12-20). "Putopisne refleksije Ivana Milčetića: Među Hrvatima Moravske, Donje Austrije i zapadne Ugarske" [The Travelogue Reflections of Ivan Milčetić: Among the Croats of Moravia, Lower Austria and Western Hungary]. Etnološka tribina (in Serbo-Croatian). 36 (29): 133–149. eISSN 1848-9540.
- Dürrigl, Marija-Ana (2006). "Prinos Ivana Milčetića poznavanju medicinske prošlosti u Primorju". Zbornik sažetaka 7. znanstvenog skupa Rijeka i Riječani u medicinskoj povjesnici. Reading: Hrvatsko znanstveno društvo za povijest zdravstvene kulture. pp. 13–14.
- n.s. (2005). "Milčetić, Ivan". Istarska enciklopedija. p. 489. ISBN 953-6036-83-5.
- Sapunar, Andrea (2004). "Milčetićev doprinos proučavanju povijesti i kulture gradišćanskih Hrvata". Mostariensia (19): 107–118. ISSN 1023-8638.
- Nazor, Anica (2003). "Milčetić i Berčićeva glagoljska zbirka u Petrogradu" [Milčetić and Berčić's Glagolitic Collection in Petersburg]. Republika (in Serbo-Croatian). 59 (3): 113–115. ISSN 0350-1337.
- Galović, Tomislav (2002-12-22). "Kako je Ivan Milčetić prikazao prošlost svoga rodnog kraja (ili Arkeologično-istočne crtice s hrvatskih otoka i Dubašnica u njima)" [How Ivan Milčetić Presented the History of His Native Region (or Archaeological-Historical Outlines from Croatian Islands and Dubašnica in Them]. Historijski zbornik (in Serbo-Croatian). 55: 237–245. ISSN 0351-2193.
- Maštrović, Tihomil (2002). "Znanstveni skup o Ivanu Milčetiću: Program znanstvenoga skupa". Zbornik o Ivanu Milčetiću, književnom povjesničaru, filologu i etnologu (PDF). Znanstveni zbornici (in Serbo-Croatian). Vol. 7. Zagreb: Hrvatski studiji Sveučilišta u Zagrebu. pp. 527–533. ISBN 953-6682-34-6.
- Šicel, Miroslav (2002). "Pred kućom Ivana Milčetića u Varaždinu" [Before the House of Ivan Milčetić in Varaždin]. Zbornik o Ivanu Milčetiću, književnom povjesničaru, filologu i etnologu (PDF). Znanstveni zbornici (in Serbo-Croatian). Vol. 7. Zagreb: Hrvatski studiji Sveučilišta u Zagrebu. p. 525. ISBN 953-6682-34-6.
- Maštrović, Tihomil (2002). "Pozdravna riječ na svečanosti otkrivanja spomen-ploče Ivanu Milčetiću u Varaždinu, 18. travnja 2001." [Greeting Speech at the Official Unveiling of the Memorial Plaque to Ivan Milčetić in Varaždin, 18. April 2001]. Zbornik o Ivanu Milčetiću, književnom povjesničaru, filologu i etnologu (PDF). Znanstveni zbornici (in Serbo-Croatian). Vol. 7. Zagreb: Hrvatski studiji Sveučilišta u Zagrebu. pp. 521–524. ISBN 953-6682-34-6.
- Šišak, Marinko (2002). "Kronika znanstvenog skupa o Ivanu Milčetiću" [Chronicle of the Scientific Conference About Ivan Milčetić]. Zbornik o Ivanu Milčetiću, književnom povjesničaru, filologu i etnologu (PDF). Znanstveni zbornici (in Serbo-Croatian). Vol. 7. Zagreb: Hrvatski studiji Sveučilišta u Zagrebu. pp. 509–520. ISBN 953-6682-34-6.
- Paro, Nedjeljka (2002). "Bibliografija Ivana Milčetića i literatura o Ivanu Milčetiću" [Bibliography of Ivan Milčetić and Literature About Ivan Milčetić]. Zbornik o Ivanu Milčetiću, književnom povjesničaru, filologu i etnologu (PDF). Znanstveni zbornici (in Serbo-Croatian). Vol. 7. Zagreb: Hrvatski studiji Sveučilišta u Zagrebu. pp. 475–508. ISBN 953-6682-34-6.
- Fišer, Ernest (2002). "Varaždinsko razdoblje života i rada Ivana Milčetića" [Ivan Milčetić His Life and Work in Varaždin]. Zbornik o Ivanu Milčetiću, književnom povjesničaru, filologu i etnologu (PDF). Znanstveni zbornici (in Serbo-Croatian). Vol. 7. Zagreb: Hrvatski studiji Sveučilišta u Zagrebu. pp. 465–472. ISBN 953-6682-34-6.
- Marijanović, Stanislav (2002). "Milčetićeve prosudbe Relkovićeva Satira i mjesta M. A. Relkovića u hrvatskoj književnosti (Slavonica in Varasdinensia)" [Milčetić's Assessment of Relković's Satir and M. A. Relković's Place in Croatian Literature (Slavonica in Varasdinensia)]. Zbornik o Ivanu Milčetiću, književnom povjesničaru, filologu i etnologu (PDF). Znanstveni zbornici (in Serbo-Croatian). Vol. 7. Zagreb: Hrvatski studiji Sveučilišta u Zagrebu. pp. 454–461. ISBN 953-6682-34-6.
- Brešić, Vinko (2002). "Milčetićevo poimanje književnih poslanica" [The Understanding of Literary Epistles by Andrija Milčetić]. Zbornik o Ivanu Milčetiću, književnom povjesničaru, filologu i etnologu (PDF). Znanstveni zbornici (in Serbo-Croatian). Vol. 7. Zagreb: Hrvatski studiji Sveučilišta u Zagrebu. pp. 447–451. ISBN 953-6682-34-6.
- Nikčević, Milorad (2002). "Kritički pogled Ivana Milčetića na književni rad Stefana Mitrova Ljubiše i književno stvaralaštvo u Boki kotorskoj" [The Critical Viewpoint of Ivan Milčetić on the Literary Work of Stefan Mitrov Ljubiša and the Literary Creativity in Boka Kotorska]. Zbornik o Ivanu Milčetiću, književnom povjesničaru, filologu i etnologu (PDF). Znanstveni zbornici (in Serbo-Croatian). Vol. 7. Zagreb: Hrvatski studiji Sveučilišta u Zagrebu. pp. 433–446. ISBN 953-6682-34-6.
- Kapraljević, Ana (2002). "Četvrt stoljeća djelovanja Ivana Milčetića u Viencu" [A Quarter Century of the Work of Ivan Milčetić in Vienac]. Zbornik o Ivanu Milčetiću, književnom povjesničaru, filologu i etnologu (PDF). Znanstveni zbornici (in Serbo-Croatian). Vol. 7. Zagreb: Hrvatski studiji Sveučilišta u Zagrebu. pp. 417–432. ISBN 953-6682-34-6.
- Mostarkić, Snježana (2002). "Korespondencija Milčetić — Jagić" [Correspondence Between Milčetić and Jagić]. Zbornik o Ivanu Milčetiću, književnom povjesničaru, filologu i etnologu (PDF). Znanstveni zbornici (in Serbo-Croatian). Vol. 7. Zagreb: Hrvatski studiji Sveučilišta u Zagrebu. pp. 403–416. ISBN 953-6682-34-6.
- Srdoč-Konestra, Ines (2002). "Milčetićev boravak u Rijeci (Milčetić i starija hrvatska književnost)" [Milčetić's Stay in Rijeka (Milčetić and older Croatian literature)]. Zbornik o Ivanu Milčetiću, književnom povjesničaru, filologu i etnologu (PDF). Znanstveni zbornici (in Serbo-Croatian). Vol. 7. Zagreb: Hrvatski studiji Sveučilišta u Zagrebu. pp. 389–402. ISBN 953-6682-34-6.
- Strčić, Petar (2002). "Otok Krk u Milčetićevo doba" [The Island of Krk in Milčetić's Time]. Zbornik o Ivanu Milčetiću, književnom povjesničaru, filologu i etnologu (PDF). Znanstveni zbornici (in Serbo-Croatian). Vol. 7. Zagreb: Hrvatski studiji Sveučilišta u Zagrebu. pp. 373–388. ISBN 953-6682-34-6.
- Dürrigl, Maria-Ana (2002). "Ivan Milčetić o najstarijoj hrvatskoglagoljskoj ljekaruši" [Ivan Milčetić on the Oldest Croatian Glagolitic Medicine Book]. Zbornik o Ivanu Milčetiću, književnom povjesničaru, filologu i etnologu (PDF). Znanstveni zbornici (in Serbo-Croatian). Vol. 7. Zagreb: Hrvatski studiji Sveučilišta u Zagrebu. pp. 365–372. ISBN 953-6682-34-6.
- Zaradija Kiš, Antonija (2002). "Ivan Milčetić (1853.–1921.) i Šimun Greblo (oko 1472.–1551.)" [Ivan Milčetić (Born 1853 – Died 1921) and Šimun Greblo (Born Aroun 1472 – Died 1551)]. Zbornik o Ivanu Milčetiću, književnom povjesničaru, filologu i etnologu (PDF). Znanstveni zbornici (in Serbo-Croatian). Vol. 7. Zagreb: Hrvatski studiji Sveučilišta u Zagrebu. pp. 357–364. ISBN 953-6682-34-6.
- Doliner, Gorana (2002). "Šibenska molitva: neke mogućnosti muzikološke interpretacije u povodu prvoga objavljivanja Ivana Milčetića i Jose Miloševića" [Šibenik Prayer: Some Insights into Musicological Interpretations Accompanying the First Publication of Ivan Milčetić and Joso Milošević]. Zbornik o Ivanu Milčetiću, književnom povjesničaru, filologu i etnologu (PDF). Znanstveni zbornici (in Serbo-Croatian). Vol. 7. Zagreb: Hrvatski studiji Sveučilišta u Zagrebu. pp. 347–356. ISBN 953-6682-34-6.
- Majer-Bobetko, Sanja (2002). "Glazbeno-publicistički i muzikološki opus Ivana Milčetića" [Musically-Journalistic and Musical Work of Ivan Milčetić]. Zbornik o Ivanu Milčetiću, književnom povjesničaru, filologu i etnologu (PDF). Znanstveni zbornici (in Serbo-Croatian). Vol. 7. Zagreb: Hrvatski studiji Sveučilišta u Zagrebu. pp. 329–346. ISBN 953-6682-34-6.
- Gobo, Tamara (2002). "Ivan Milčetić o hrvatskim demonološkim ili mitskim predajima" [Ivan Milčetić on Croatian Demonological and Mythological Tradition]. Zbornik o Ivanu Milčetiću, književnom povjesničaru, filologu i etnologu (PDF). Znanstveni zbornici (in Serbo-Croatian). Vol. 7. Zagreb: Hrvatski studiji Sveučilišta u Zagrebu. pp. 319–327. ISBN 953-6682-34-6.
- Banov, Estela (2002). "Ivan Milčetić o koledarskim pjesmama i običajima" [Ivan Milčetić on Carolling Songs and Customs]. Zbornik o Ivanu Milčetiću, književnom povjesničaru, filologu i etnologu (PDF). Znanstveni zbornici (in Serbo-Croatian). Vol. 7. Zagreb: Hrvatski studiji Sveučilišta u Zagrebu. pp. 309–317. ISBN 953-6682-34-6.
- Bacalja, Robert (2002). "Ivan Milčetić o Zanovićevim pjesmama" [Ivan Milčetić on Zanović's Poems]. Zbornik o Ivanu Milčetiću, književnom povjesničaru, filologu i etnologu (PDF). Znanstveni zbornici (in Serbo-Croatian). Vol. 7. Zagreb: Hrvatski studiji Sveučilišta u Zagrebu. pp. 299–308. ISBN 953-6682-34-6.
- Šišak, Marinko (2002). "Politička misao i djelovanje Ivana Milčetića" [Political Thought and Activity of Ivan Milčetić]. Zbornik o Ivanu Milčetiću, književnom povjesničaru, filologu i etnologu (PDF). Znanstveni zbornici (in Serbo-Croatian). Vol. 7. Zagreb: Hrvatski studiji Sveučilišta u Zagrebu. pp. 287–297. ISBN 953-6682-34-6.
- Vulić, Sanja (2002). "Milčetić i Hrvati na gradišćanskohrvatskom govornom području" [Milčetić and the Croats in the Burgenland Croatian Speech Area]. Zbornik o Ivanu Milčetiću, književnom povjesničaru, filologu i etnologu (PDF). Znanstveni zbornici (in Serbo-Croatian). Vol. 7. Zagreb: Hrvatski studiji Sveučilišta u Zagrebu. pp. 261–286. ISBN 953-6682-34-6.
- Zubčić, Sanja (2002). "Neizravan dijalektološki rad Ivana Milčetića" [The Indirect Dialectological Work of Ivan Milčetić]. Zbornik o Ivanu Milčetiću, književnom povjesničaru, filologu i etnologu (PDF). Znanstveni zbornici (in Serbo-Croatian). Vol. 7. Zagreb: Hrvatski studiji Sveučilišta u Zagrebu. pp. 245–259. ISBN 953-6682-34-6.
- Rišner, Vlasta (2002). "O jeziku Milčetića" [On Milčetić's Language]. Zbornik o Ivanu Milčetiću, književnom povjesničaru, filologu i etnologu (PDF). Znanstveni zbornici (in Serbo-Croatian). Vol. 7. Zagreb: Hrvatski studiji Sveučilišta u Zagrebu. pp. 231–243. ISBN 953-6682-34-6.
- Ham, Sanda (2002). "Milčetićevi pogledi na jezična zbivanja 19. stoljeća" [Milčetić's Views on Language Activities in the 19th Century]. Zbornik o Ivanu Milčetiću, književnom povjesničaru, filologu i etnologu (PDF). Znanstveni zbornici (in Serbo-Croatian). Vol. 7. Zagreb: Hrvatski studiji Sveučilišta u Zagrebu. pp. 217–230. ISBN 953-6682-34-6.
- Zvonar, Ivan (2002). "Ivan Milčetić i kantorska spričavanja". Zbornik o Ivanu Milčetiću, književnom povjesničaru, filologu i etnologu (PDF). Znanstveni zbornici (in Serbo-Croatian). Vol. 7. Zagreb: Hrvatski studiji Sveučilišta u Zagrebu. pp. 189–215. ISBN 953-6682-34-6.
  - Republished in Na kajkavskim korijenima: rasprave i studije [At the Kajkavian Roots: Debates and Papers] (in Serbo-Croatian). Samobor: Meridijani. 2009. ISBN 978-953-239-108-4.
- Mihanović-Salopek, Hrvojka (2002). "Doprinos Ivana Milčetića proučavanju hrvatske crkvene himnodije" [The Contribution of Ivan Milčetić Towards the Study of Church Hymns]. Zbornik o Ivanu Milčetiću, književnom povjesničaru, filologu i etnologu (PDF). Znanstveni zbornici (in Serbo-Croatian). Vol. 7. Zagreb: Hrvatski studiji Sveučilišta u Zagrebu. pp. 177–188. ISBN 953-6682-34-6.
  - Republished in U ogledalu kritike [In the Mirror of Criticism] (in Serbo-Croatian). Zagreb: Udruga Prosoli. 2013. ISBN 9789535624936.
- Pšihistal, Ružica (2002). "Milčetićevo predavanje o Maruliću godine 1901.: prinos obljetnici / prinos marulologiji" [Milčetić's Lecture from 1901 on Marulić: A Contribution to the Anniversary/A Contribution to Marulology]. Zbornik o Ivanu Milčetiću, književnom povjesničaru, filologu i etnologu (PDF). Znanstveni zbornici (in Serbo-Croatian). Vol. 7. Zagreb: Hrvatski studiji Sveučilišta u Zagrebu. pp. 155–176. ISBN 953-6682-34-6.
- Nazor, Anica (2002a). "Milčetićev odnos prema ćirilici" [Milčetić's Relationship Towards Cyrillic Script]. Zbornik o Ivanu Milčetiću, književnom povjesničaru, filologu i etnologu (PDF). Znanstveni zbornici (in Serbo-Croatian). Vol. 7. Zagreb: Hrvatski studiji Sveučilišta u Zagrebu. pp. 149–153. ISBN 953-6682-34-6.
- Sapunar, Andrea (2002). "Milčetićev putopis o Hrvatima Moravske, Donje Austrije i zapadne Ugarske" [Milčetić's Travel Book on Croatians from Moravia, Lower Austria and Western Hungary]. Zbornik o Ivanu Milčetiću, književnom povjesničaru, filologu i etnologu (PDF). Znanstveni zbornici (in Serbo-Croatian). Vol. 7. Zagreb: Hrvatski studiji Sveučilišta u Zagrebu. pp. 135–148. ISBN 953-6682-34-6.
- Rados, Zvjezdana (2002). "Milčetić kao putopisac" [Ivan Milčetić as a Travel Writer]. Zbornik o Ivanu Milčetiću, književnom povjesničaru, filologu i etnologu (PDF). Znanstveni zbornici (in Serbo-Croatian). Vol. 7. Zagreb: Hrvatski studiji Sveučilišta u Zagrebu. pp. 121–134. ISBN 953-6682-34-6.
- Grbić Jakopović, Jadranka (2002). "Etnografsko-etnološki i folkloristički rad Ivana Milčetića" [Ethnographical and Ethnological Folklore Work by Ivan Milčetić]. Zbornik o Ivanu Milčetiću, književnom povjesničaru, filologu i etnologu (PDF). Znanstveni zbornici (in Serbo-Croatian). Vol. 7. Zagreb: Hrvatski studiji Sveučilišta u Zagrebu. pp. 113–119. ISBN 953-6682-34-6.
- Jembrih, Alojz (2002). "Milčetić o kajkavštini" [Ivan Milčetić on the Position of Croatian Kajkavian Dialect]. Zbornik o Ivanu Milčetiću, književnom povjesničaru, filologu i etnologu (PDF). Znanstveni zbornici (in Serbo-Croatian). Vol. 7. Zagreb: Hrvatski studiji Sveučilišta u Zagrebu. pp. 99–112. ISBN 953-6682-34-6.
- Botica, Stipe (2002). "Milčetić o Majamontijevu djelu" [Milčetić About Bajamontis Works]. Zbornik o Ivanu Milčetiću, književnom povjesničaru, filologu i etnologu (PDF). Znanstveni zbornici (in Serbo-Croatian). Vol. 7. Zagreb: Hrvatski studiji Sveučilišta u Zagrebu. pp. 89–98. ISBN 953-6682-34-6.
- Maštrović, Tihomir (2002). "Ivan Milčetić o Nikoli Tommaseu" [Ivan Milčetić on Nikola Tommaseo]. Zbornik o Ivanu Milčetiću, književnom povjesničaru, filologu i etnologu (PDF). Znanstveni zbornici (in Serbo-Croatian). Vol. 7. Zagreb: Hrvatski studiji Sveučilišta u Zagrebu. pp. 81–88. ISBN 953-6682-34-6.
- Bratulić, Josip (2002). "Ivan Milčetić o Ljudevitu Gaju i ilirskoj ideji u Hrvatskoj u prvoj polovici XIX. stoljeća" [Ivan Milčetić on Ljudevit Gaj and the Illyrian Idea in Croatia in the First Half of the 19th Century]. Zbornik o Ivanu Milčetiću, književnom povjesničaru, filologu i etnologu (PDF). Znanstveni zbornici (in Serbo-Croatian). Vol. 7. Zagreb: Hrvatski studiji Sveučilišta u Zagrebu. pp. 65–76. ISBN 953-6682-34-6.
- Šicel, Miroslav (2002). "Ivan Milčetić i književnost hrvatskoga narodnog preporoda" [Ivan Milčetić and the Literature of the Croatian National Renaissance]. Zbornik o Ivanu Milčetiću, književnom povjesničaru, filologu i etnologu (PDF). Znanstveni zbornici (in Serbo-Croatian). Vol. 7. Zagreb: Hrvatski studiji Sveučilišta u Zagrebu. pp. 59–64. ISBN 953-6682-34-6.
- Stojević, Milorad (2002). "Ivan Milčetić o hrvatskim renesansnim poslanicama" [Ivan Milčetić on Croatian Renaissance Epistles]. Zbornik o Ivanu Milčetiću, književnom povjesničaru, filologu i etnologu (PDF). Znanstveni zbornici (in Serbo-Croatian). Vol. 7. Zagreb: Hrvatski studiji Sveučilišta u Zagrebu. pp. 51–58. ISBN 953-6682-34-6.
- Kolumbić, Nikica (2002). "Milčetić o Marulićevim prethodnicima" [Milčetić on Marulić's predecessors]. Zbornik o Ivanu Milčetiću, književnom povjesničaru, filologu i etnologu (PDF). Znanstveni zbornici (in Serbo-Croatian). Vol. 7. Zagreb: Hrvatski studiji Sveučilišta u Zagrebu. pp. 45–50. ISBN 953-6682-34-6.
- Олеговна Вялова, Светлана (2002). "Иван Милчетић — первый исследователь глаголических памятников собрания Ивана Берчића в Российской национальной библиотке в Петербурге" [Ivan Milčetić — The First Researcher of the Glagolitic Monuments of the Collection of Ivan Berčić in the Russian National Library in Petersburg]. Zbornik o Ivanu Milčetiću, književnom povjesničaru, filologu i etnologu (PDF). Znanstveni zbornici (in Serbo-Croatian). Vol. 7. Zagreb: Hrvatski studiji Sveučilišta u Zagrebu. pp. 39–44. ISBN 953-6682-34-6.
- Nazor, Anica (2002b). "Milčetićev opis tiskanih glagoljskih knjiga u petrogradskoj zbirci Ivana Berčića" [Milčetić's Description of Published Glagolitic Books in Ivan Berčić's Collection from Sankt Petersburg]. Zbornik o Ivanu Milčetiću, književnom povjesničaru, filologu i etnologu (PDF). Znanstveni zbornici (in Serbo-Croatian). Vol. 7. Zagreb: Hrvatski studiji Sveučilišta u Zagrebu. pp. 33–38. ISBN 953-6682-34-6.
- Aleksandrov-Pogačnik, Nina (2002). "Dosezi i granice filologije (Uz radove Ivana Milčetića)" [Levels and Ranges of Philology (About Ivan Milčetić's Work)]. Zbornik o Ivanu Milčetiću, književnom povjesničaru, filologu i etnologu (PDF). Znanstveni zbornici (in Serbo-Croatian). Vol. 7. Zagreb: Hrvatski studiji Sveučilišta u Zagrebu. pp. 27–32. ISBN 953-6682-34-6.
- Damjanović, Stjepan (2002). "Ivan Milčetić — istraživač hrvatskoga glagolizma" [Ivan Milčetić — A Researcher of Croatian Glagolitism]. Zbornik o Ivanu Milčetiću, književnom povjesničaru, filologu i etnologu (PDF). Znanstveni zbornici (in Serbo-Croatian). Vol. 7. Zagreb: Hrvatski studiji Sveučilišta u Zagrebu. pp. 9–25. ISBN 953-6682-34-6.
- Maštrović, Tihomil (2002). "Riječ urednika" [Word from the Editor]. Zbornik o Ivanu Milčetiću, književnom povjesničaru, filologu i etnologu (PDF). Znanstveni zbornici (in Serbo-Croatian). Vol. 7. Zagreb: Hrvatski studiji Sveučilišta u Zagrebu. pp. 5–6. ISBN 953-6682-34-6.
- Gašparović, Darko (2001-11-16). Ivan Milčetić o kazalištu. Znanstveni skup o Ivanu Milčetiću. Varaždin.
- Blasina-Miseri, Antonia (2001-04-20). Milčetićeve talijanske teme. Znanstveni skup o Ivanu Milčetiću. Malinska.
- Lipovčan, Srećko (2001-04-20). Polemika Milčetić - Strohal o hrvatskoj glagoljskoj književnosti. Znanstveni skup o Ivanu Milčetiću. Malinska.
- Bratulić, Josip (2001). "Ivan Milčetić i Branko Vodnik" [Ivan Milčetić and Branko Vodnik]. Zbornik o Branku Vodniku, književnom povjesničaru (PDF). Znanstveni zbornici (in Serbo-Croatian). Vol. 6. Hrvatski studiji Sveučilišta u Zagrebu. pp. 85–94. ISBN 953-6682-22-2.
- Zubčić-Bogović, Sanja (2000). "Izravan dijalektološki rad Ivana Milčetića". Zbornik radova s Međunarodnog znanstvenog skupa 3. Riječki filološki dani. Filozofski Fakultet Sveučilišta u Rijeci. pp. 59–73. ISBN 953-6104-02-4.
- Damjanović, Stjepan (2000). Filološki razgovori. Biblioteka Portreti. ISBN 953-169-046-4.
- Damjanović, Stjepan (1996-09-30). "Ivan Milčetić – istraživač hrvatskoga glagolizma" [Ivan Milčetić – A Researcher of Croatian Glagolitism]. Slovo: Časopis Staroslavenskog instituta (in Serbo-Croatian) (44–46): 353–371. ISSN 0583-6255.
- Damjanović, Stjepan (1993). "Ivan Milčetić". Portreti hrvatskih jezikoslovaca. Biblioteka Hrvatski radio. Vol. 5. Zagreb: Hrvatski radio. p. 129.
- Damjanović, Stjepan (1993). "Filološke polemike Ivana Milčetića". Filologija: časopis Razreda za filološke znanosti Hrvatske akademije znanosti i umjetnosti (20–21): 59–66. ISSN 0449-363X.
- Damjanović, Stjepan (1991-10-30). "Ivan Milčetić - jezikoslovac" [Ivan Milčetić - Linguist]. Senjski zbornik (in Serbo-Croatian). 18 (18): 15–21. ISSN 0582-673X.
- Duplančić, Arsen (1984-12-31). "Sjećanja Ivana Milčetića na Split i Franu Bulića" [Ivan Milčetić's Recollections of Split and Frane Bulić]. Kulturna baština (in Serbo-Croatian) (15): 37–50. ISSN 0351-0557.
- Nikočević, Lidija (1984-12-01). "Život i djelo Ivana Milčetića" [The Life and Work of Ivan Milčetić]. Etnološka tribina (in Serbo-Croatian). 13–14 (6–7): 91–96.
- Hercigonja, Eduard (1983). "Milčetićeva 'Hrvatska glagolska bibliografija' (1911) i Jagićeva 'Hrvatska glagolska književnost' između Jagića i Kombola (1913–1945)" [Milčetić's 'Hrvatska glagolska bibliografija' (1911) and Jagić's 'Hrvatska glagolska književnost' Between Jagić and Kombol]. Nad iskonom hrvatske knjige: Rasprave o hrvatskoglagoljskom srednjovjekovlju (in Serbo-Croatian). Zagreb: Liber. pp. 62–76.
- Musić, August (1923). "Ivan Milčetić". Ljetopis Jugoslavenske akademije znanosti i umjetnosti (in Serbo-Croatian). 38. JAZU: 77–106.
- Mahulja, Jerko J. (1906b). "Za mjesec decembar stigli su sliedeći prinosi" [For the Month of December the Following Contributions Arrived] (PDF). Naša sloga: Poučni, gospodarski i politički list (in Serbo-Croatian). Vol. 39, no. 4. p. 4.
- Mahulja, Jerko J. (1906a). "Krčki kotar: Skupština "Staroslavenske akademije"" [Krk Kotar: Meeting of the "Staroslavenska akademija"] (PDF). Naša sloga: Poučni, gospodarski i politički list (in Serbo-Croatian). Vol. 39, no. 4. p. 3.
- Bonefačić, Kvirin Klement "Daroslav" (1903). Dragutin A. Parčić: 26. V.1832. - 25. XII.1902. 26.V.1832 25.Xii.1902. (in Serbo-Croatian). Krk: Kurykta.
- Venko (1922-02-21). Izvadak Vjenčanog lista (Testimonium copulationis) Ivana Milčetića i Štefanije Lendvaj (PDF) (in Serbo-Croatian).
- Žic, Nikola (1912a). "Članovi". Vjesnik Staroslavenske akademije u Krku (in Croatian). 1 (published 1913): 10–16.
- Mužina, Mijo (1903). "Poslanica prof. Ivanu Milčetiću u Varaždinu" [Letter to Prof. Ivan Milčetić in Varaždin] (PDF). Naša sloga: Poučni, gospodarski i politički list (in Serbo-Croatian). Vol. 34, no. 36. pp. 6–7.
- Milčetić, Ivan (1903a). "Paval Bogović-Šimov (Konac)" (PDF). Naša sloga: Poučni, gospodarski i politički list (in Serbo-Croatian). Vol. 34, no. 31. p. 4.
- Milčetić, Ivan (1903b). "Paval Bogović-Šimov" (PDF). Naša sloga: Poučni, gospodarski i politički list (in Serbo-Croatian). Vol. 34, no. 30. p. 3.
- Mužina, Mijo (1903b). "† Paval Bogović-Šimov" (PDF). Naša sloga: Poučni, gospodarski i politički list (in Serbo-Croatian). Vol. 34, no. 28. p. 3.
- Jagić, Vatroslav (1883). "Von Herrn Gymn.-Prof. Ivan Milčetić in Warasdin: O poslanicama XVI. vijeka u dubrovačko-dalmatinskoj periodi hrvatske književnosti". Archiv für slavische Philologie (in German). 7 (published 1884): 500–501.
- Odbor (1878b). "Članovi "Hrvatskog Doma" godine 1877/8". Hrvatski Dom: Zabavnik Hrvatske Omladine (in Serbo-Croatian). 3. Zagreb: Tisak dioničke tiskare: XX–XXI.
- Odbor (1878a). "Hrvatski Dom". Hrvatski Dom: Zabavnik Hrvatske Omladine (in Serbo-Croatian). 3. Zagreb: Tisak dioničke tiskare: V–XIX. Esp. pp. X–XVI.
  - Republished by Josip Bratulić on pp. 77–80 of Zbornik o Ivanu Milčetiću.
- Odbor (1877). "Dvie tri o družtvu "Hrvaski dom"". Hrvatski Dom: Zabavnik Hrvatske Omladine (in Serbo-Croatian). 3. Zagreb: Tisak dioničke tiskare: VII–XV.
