= Stjepanović =

Stjepanović (Serbian: Стјепановић) is a South Slavic patronymic surname derived from a masculine given name Stjepan. Notable people bearing this surname:

- Boro Stjepanović (born 1946), actor
- Nemanja Stjepanović (born 1984), footballer
- Ostoja Stjepanović (born 1985), footballer
- Slaven Stjepanović (born 1987), footballer
- Velimir Stjepanović (born 1993), swimmer
- Zoran Stjepanović (born 1975), footballer
