= Stipić =

Stipić (Serbian Cyrillic: Стипић) is a Serbo-Croatian family name, a patronymic of Stipe. Notable people with this name include:

- Milan Stipić (1978), Croatian Greek Catholic hierarch
- Nikola Stipić (1937), former Serbian footballer
- Tomislav Stipić (1979), Croatian-German professional football manager
