= Milčetići =

- Village
- Location within Krk Location within Croatia
- Coordinates: 45.11778°N 14.52066°E
- Country: Croatia
- County: Primorje-Gorski Kotar
- Municipality: Malinska-Dubašnica

Area
  - Total: 0.3 km^{2} (0.12 sq mi)

Population (2021)
  - Total: 251
  - Density: 840/km^{2} (2,200/sq mi)
- Time zone: UTC+1 (CET)
  - Summer (DST): UTC+2 (CEST)

Milčetići is a village located on the northwestern coast of the Croatian island of Krk. Located just to the southwest of Malinska, it is part of the municipality of Malinska-Dubašnica. As of 2021, it had 251 inhabitants.

== Notable people ==
- Ivan Milčetić (1853–1921)
