= Igor Zidić =

Igor Zidić (born 10 February 1939) is a Croatian art historian, art critic, poet and essayist. He is considered an expert on Croatian modern art.

Zidić was born in Split, where he graduated from the Classical Gymnasium. He obtained a diploma in art history and comparative literature from the University of Zagreb in 1964. Zidić became the editor of Hrvatski tjednik in 1971, but lost his job after the magazine was shut down by the Yugoslavian government.

Zidić was a director of Modern Gallery in Zagreb from 1989 to 2008. From 2002–14, he was the president of Matica hrvatska. In 1986, Zidić received the Tin Ujević Award for poetry.

Zidić is a father of six children.

== Sources ==
- Robert Bajruši (19 February 2003). "Igor Zidić predsjednički kandidat desnice" [Igor Zidić as a right wing presidential candidate] (in Croatian). Nacional (weekly). Archived from the original on 6 April 2012.
- "Igor Zidić - predsjednik Matice Hrvatske". hpb.hr (in Croatian). Archived from the original on 6 March 2012.

Cultural offices
Preceded by Josip Bratulić	President of Matica hrvatska 2002–2014	Succeeded by Stjepan Damjanović
