= Stipan =

Stipan is a masculine given name cognate to Stjepan (Stephen), used by ikavian speakers.

Notable people with the name include:

- Stipan Blažetin, Hungarian-Croatian writer
- Stipan Dora, Bunjevac wrestler from Serbia
- Stipan Đurić, Hungarian-Croatian actor and singer
- Stipan Konzul, Croatian Protestant writer

== See also ==
- Sustipan
- Stipanić
- Stipanići
- Stipanović
- Stipančević
- Stipe (given name)
