= Stipanovich =

Stipanovich is a surname, an anglicized form of Stipanović. Notable people with the surname include:

- John McKager Stipanovich (born 1948), American politician from Florida
- Steve Stipanovich (born 1960), American basketball player
