= Maja Stipančević =

Croatian footballer (born 1994)

Personal information
- Full name: Maja Stipančević
- Date of birth: 7 May 1994 (age 32)
- Place of birth: Nova Gradiška, Croatia
- Position: Defender

Team information
- Current team: Viktorija

Senior career*
Years	Team	Apps	(Gls)
2011–	Viktorija	29	(0)

International career^{‡}
	Croatia	1	(0)
- * Club domestic league appearances and goals as of 23 May 2013 ‡ National team caps and goals as of 23 May 2013

Maja Stipančević (born 7 May 1994) is a Croatian footballer who plays as defender for Viktorija.

== Club career ==
Stipančević began her career in the youth team of Viktorija. She has been playing for Viktorija's first team in the 1. HNL since 2011 and has made 29 first-division appearances for her club in the top Croatian women's football league.

== International career ==
Stipančević made her senior international debut at the age of just 15, on 21 August 2009, against the Bosnia and Herzegovina national team.

== Personal life ==
Stipančević's older sister, Valentina, also played a number of matches for the Croatian football national team.
