= Valentina Stipančević =

Croatian footballer

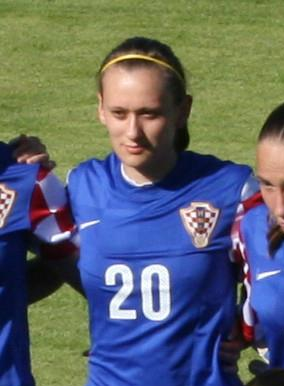

Personal information
- Full name: Valentina Stipančević
- Date of birth: 29 February 1992 (age 34)
- Place of birth: Nova Gradiška, Croatia
- Position: Forward

Team information
- Current team: Rijeka-Jack Pot
- Number: 20

Senior career*
Years	Team	Apps	(Gls)
2009–2011	Viktorija	23	(5)
2011–2012	Dinamo-Maksimir	18	(2)
2012–	Rijeka-Jack Pot	18	(2)

International career^{‡}
2006–2007	Croatia U17	6	(0)
2009–2011	Croatia U19	4	(0)
2012–	Croatia	5	(0)
- * Club domestic league appearances and goals as of 13:59, 18 September 2015 (UTC) ‡ National team caps and goals as of 13:59, 18 September 2015 (UTC)

Valentina Stipančević (born 29 February 1992) is a Croatian football forward, who plays for ŽNK Rijeka-Jack Pot and the Croatia national team.

== Club career ==
Stipančević started her career in the youth of the ŽNK Amazonke Nova Gradiška. In Summer 2009, she left her hometown Nova Gradiška and moved to ŽNK Viktorija. She has played in 18 games for ŽNK Dinamo-Maksimir in the 1st HNL in the 2011–2012 season. She then moved to ŽNK Rijeka in Summer 2012.

== International career ==
Stipančević is a national player for Croatia. She made her senior international debut against Serbia on 16 August 2012.

== Personal life ==
Her younger sister, Maja, also played a few matches for the Croatian football national team.
