= Stipe (given name) =

Stipe a Croatian masculine given name. It is cognate to Stephen, and found in areas where people speak Ikavian.

Notable people with the name include:

- Stipe Bačelić-Grgić (1988–), Croatian footballer
- Stipe Balajić (1968–), Croatian footballer
- Stipe Božić (1951–), Croatian alpinist
- Stipe Delić (1925–1999), Croatian film director
- Stipe Drews (born Drviš; 1973–), Croatian boxer
- Stipe Erceg (1974–), German-Croatian actor
- Stipe Lapić (1983–), Croatian footballer
- Stipe Matić (1979–), Croatian footballer
- Stipe Miocic (1982–), Croatian-American mixed martial artist; also paramedic and firefighter
- Stipe Modrić (1979–), Croatian-Slovenian basketballer and coach
- Stipe Pletikosa (1979–), Croatian football goalkeeper
- Stipe Šuvar (1936–2004), Croatian politician

== See also ==
- Stipan
- Stjepan
- Stipić
