= Stipe (surname) =

Stipe (surname) is a surname. Notable people with the surname include:

- Lynda Stipe (born 1962), American singer and bass guitarist
- Michael Stipe (born 1960), lead singer of American rock band R.E.M
- Gene Stipe (1926–2012), American politician
- Reginald Stipe (1883–1976), Canadian politician and physician
