= Stjepan Andrašić =

Croatian journalist (1941–2025)

Stjepan Andrašić (17 August 1941 – 30 May 2025) was a Croatian journalist and publisher. He was the editor-in-chief of Vecernji list from 1983 to 1990. He also founded the publishing company Masmedia in 1990 and bought the newspaper Dnevnik in 2004.

== Life and career ==
Andrašić graduated from the Faculty of Forestry at the University of Zagreb. During his studies, he collaborated in the Studentski list.

He entered into employment with Večernji list on 1 January 1971. In that newspaper, he worked as associate journalist in the city section, then in the internal politics section, editor of the night edition, internal politics section, assistant, then deputy editor-in-chief. He was the editor-in-chief of Večernji list from 1983 to 1990.

In 1990, he founded the publishing company Masmedia which published nearly 1000 original and reprints of business and professional books, and 80 CDs of professional and scientific content. He founded magazines with a large German publisher: Graditelj, CRO-Turizam, Instalater, Automobil Service, Elektro, Trgovina and Beauty Forum. In 2004, he bought the newspaper Dnevnik from EPH, which he renamed to Poslovni dnevnik in 2005, and in 2006 he launched the portal of the same name (then sold to the company 24sata d.o.o.), and the monthly magazine Investor.

Andrašić died on 30 May 2025, at the age of 83.
