= Dušan Stipanović =

Politician

Dušan Stipanović (Serbian Cyrillic: Душан Стипановић; born 1956) is a politician in Serbia. He served in the Assembly of Vojvodina from 2016 to 2020 and is now a member of the city assembly of Subotica. A member of the Socialist Party of Serbia (Socijalistička partija Srbije, SPS) for many years, he joined the Movement of Socialists (Pokret socijalista, PS) in 2015.

== Private career ==
Stipanović is a customs officer. He lives in the Bajmok community of Subotica.

== Politician ==
Stipanović was a founding member of the SPS in Subotica.

For the 2008 local elections in Subotica, the Socialist Party joined an electoral alliance with the far-right Serbian Radical Party (Srpska radikalna stranka, SRS) and the Democratic Party of Serbia (Demokratska stranka Srbije, DSS). Stipanović received the sixty-second position on their combined electoral list and was not selected for a mandate when the list won thirteen out of sixty-seven seats. (From 2000 to 2011, mandates in Serbian elections held under proportional representation were awarded to successful parties or coalitions rather than individual candidates, and it was common practice for the mandates to be awarded out of numerical order. Stipanović could have been given a mandate despite his low position on the list, but he was not.)

Serbia's electoral system was reformed in 2011, such that mandates were awarded in numerical order to candidates on successful lists. Stipanović was given the fourth position on the Socialist Party's list for Subotica in the 2012 local elections and was elected when the list won four mandates. He led the Socialist group in the local assembly. On 2 March 2015, he and other prominent local SPS officials were expelled from the party against the backdrop of serious internal divisions. Eight days later, he and other SPS assembly delegates joined the PS. As before, Stipanović served as his group's leader in the assembly.

The PS has been aligned with the Serbian Progressive Party (Srpska napredna stranka, SNS) since 2012 at the republic and provincial levels and in most Serbian municipalities. Stipanović received the forty-first position on the Progressive-led Aleksandar Vučić – Serbia Is Winning electoral list in the 2016 Vojvodina provincial election and was elected when the list won a majority victory with sixty-three out of 120 mandates. He served with the government's parliamentary majority for the next four years and did not seek re-election at the provincial level in 2020.

Stipanović received the nineteenth position on the Progressive Party's coalition list in the 2020 local elections in Subotica and was re-elected to the city assembly when the list won a plurality victory with thirty-one mandates. He is once again the leader of the PS group in the assembly.
