= Stjepan Damjanović =

Croatian linguist (1946)

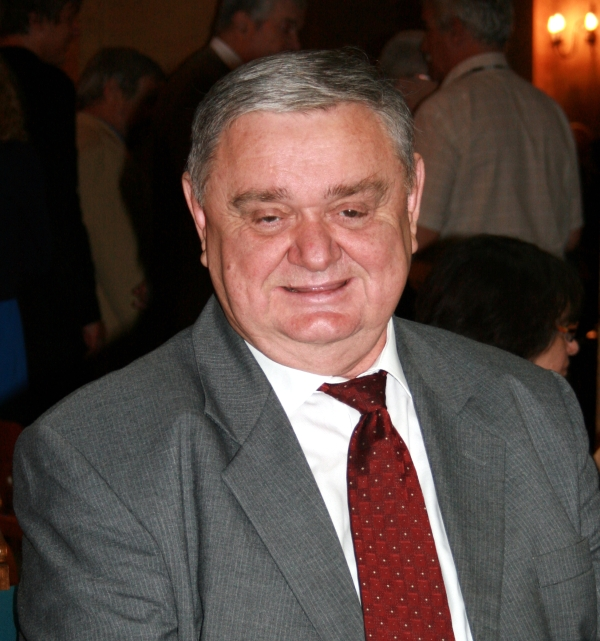
Stjepan Damjanović

Stjepan Damjanović (born 2 November 1946) is a Croatian linguist, philologist and palaeoslavist. He worked as a regular professor at the Faculty of Humanities and Social Sciences at the University of Zagreb. He is a former President of Matica hrvatska.

== Biography ==
He was born on 2 November 1946 in Strizivojna near Đakovo. He graduated Yugoslav languages and literatures and Russian at the Faculty of Humanities and Social Sciences in Zagreb, where he has been working ever since. In 1971 he served as an assistant to the professor Eduard Hercigonja at the Department for Old Church Slavonic (today called Department for Old Church Slavonic language and Croatian Glagolitic), in 1982 he was promoted to docent and in 1986 to full professor. In the period 1992–2008 he was head of the department. At the Faculty of Humanities and Social Sciences he had earned his M.A. (1977) and Ph.D. (1982) with theses on the languages of medieval Croatian texts. Damjanović retired from teaching at the Faculty in 2017.

In 1998 he became an associate member, and in 2004 a regular member of Croatian Academy of Sciences and Arts.

He also taught courses at the universities of Osijek, Rijeka, Mostar, Bochum, Graz and Prague. He served as a president of the Committee of Croatian Slavists and organized the First Croatian Congress of Slavists in Pula. In 1996–2000 he was a member of the Administrative Council of the University of Zagreb, and in the period 1999-2002 he was the Secretary-General of Matica hrvatska. He founded and edited Matica's publishing series Inozemni kroatisti ("Foreign Croatists").

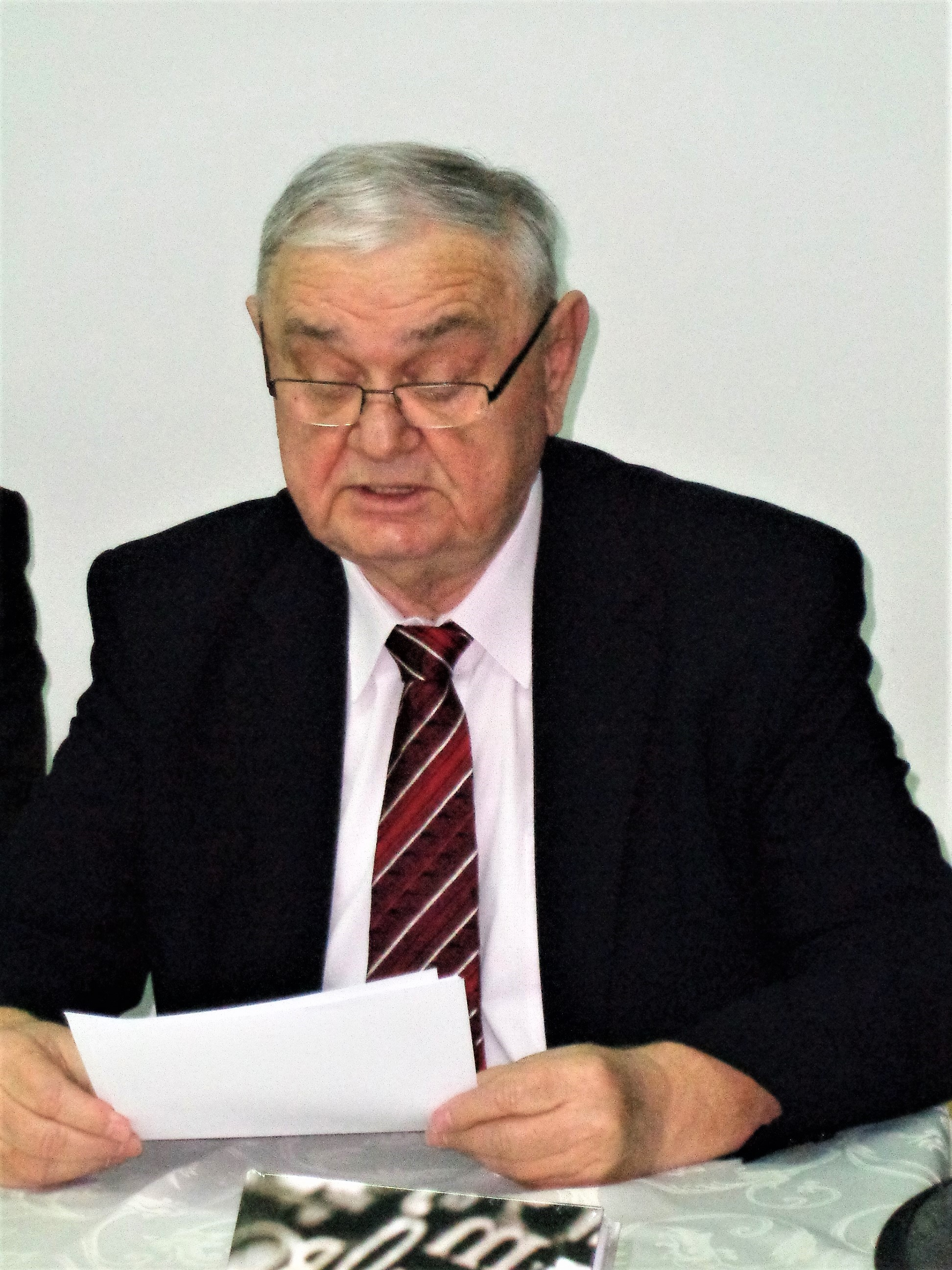
Damjanović at the "Care for the Spirit of the Nation" book presentation in Čakovec (2020)

== Work ==
Damjanović published about 60 scientific papers, 80 recensions and about a dozen books. Some of his notable books are:

- Tragom jezika hrvatskih glagoljaša (1984)
- Opširnost bez površnosti (1988)
- Jedanaest stoljeća nezaborava (1991)
- Jazik otačaski (1995)
- Glasovi i oblici općeslavenskoga književnoga jezika (1993, reprinted under the titles Staroslavenski glasovi i oblici and Staroslavenski jezik)
- Filološki razgovori (2000)
- Slovo iskona. Staroslavenska/starohrvatska čitanka (1st ed. 2002, 2nd ed. 2004)
- Mali staroslavensko-hrvatski rječnik (2004, co-authored with I. Jurčeviće, T. Kuštović, B. Kuzmić, M. Lukić, M. Žagar)
- Slavonske teme (2006)
- Hrvatska pisana kultura (co-authored with Josip Bratulić, 1st volume in 2005, 2nd in 2006, 3rd in 2008)
- Jezik hrvatskih glagoljaša (2008)

Cultural offices
Preceded by Igor Zidić	President of Matica hrvatska 2014–2018	Succeeded by Stipe Botica
