= Eduard Hercigonja =

Croatian philologist and literary historian (1929–2022)

- Born: 20 August 1929; Zagreb, Kingdom of Yugoslavia
- Died: 22 May 2022 (aged 92)
- Occupation: Historian

Eduard Hercigonja (20 August 1929 – 22 May 2022) was a Croatian philologist, Croatist and literary historian. University professor and a member of the Croatian Academy of Sciences and Arts, he authored several fundamental works on medieval Croatian literature and culture.

== Biography ==
Hercigonja was born in Croatia's capital Zagreb in 1929. After finishing primary and secondary school in Sisak, he received a degree in Slavic studies at the Faculty of Humanities and Social Sciences at the University of Zagreb. He received his Ph.D. in 1970 with the thesis Jezik glagoljaške neliturgijske književnosti 15. stoljeća i Petrisov zbornik ('Language of the Glagolitic non-liturgical literature and Petris' miscellany'). He was elected as a docent in 1970, as an associate professor in 1974, becoming a full professor in 1977. Since 1968 he has served as a head of the chair for the Old Church Slavonic language at the Department for Croatian Studies. Since 1977 he has been an associate, and since 1986 a full member of the Croatian Academy of Sciences and Arts.

== Work ==
Hercoginja's research interest focuses on Croatian Middle Ages. His Srednjovjekovna književnost ('Medieval literature') in »Liber's« edition Povijest hrvatske književnosti ('The history of Croatian literature'; Volume II, Zagreb 1975), based on extensive textological, linguistic and historical research of Glagolitic heritage, has managed to paint a different picture of medieval Croatian texts as what used to be called a 'precursor of literature' (A. Cronia).

In a series of analytical papers he warns of Čakavian-Kajkavian (and also Old Church Slavonic) interference in Glagolitic manuscripts as a result of conscious and deliberate effort of medieval writers to expand the area of influence of their works. Some of the papers, as well as discussions on stylemastics, orthography, language, education, socio-economic situation and the potentials of Croatian Glagolites and their treatment in the historical accounts of Croatian literature, have been compiled in a book Nad iskonom hrvatske knjige (1986).

As a researcher he always advocated a theory of the unity of Croatian medieval literature, despite its polyscriptal nature and dialectal diversity. This way he helped to provide a different perspective at the relationship of the Croatian Latinate literature, and that written in Croatian idioms. In the catalog of the exhibition Pisana riječ u Hrvatskoj (Muzejski prostor, Zagreb 1986) he published a study of three-script and three-lingual culture of the Croatian Middle Ages, which served as a basis of the book by the same name. In 1994 Matica hrvatska published his Tropismena i trojezična kultura hrvatskoga srednjovjekovlja conceived as an account of the most relevant facts from the 9th century Trpimir's inscription up to the 15th century first printed Croatian book (Missale Romanum Glagolitice). His 2004 book Na temeljima hrvatske književne kulture: filološko medievističke rasprave, also published by Matica, represents a compilation of author's 50 years of scientific work and study of Croatian literature since the Middle Ages till the 18th century.

For his work he received state awards (1975 and 1983), and the Zagreb City Award (1975). He was an honorary scientific adviser of the University of Osijek.

Hercigonja died on 22 May 2022.
