= Josip Bratulić =

Croatian philologist

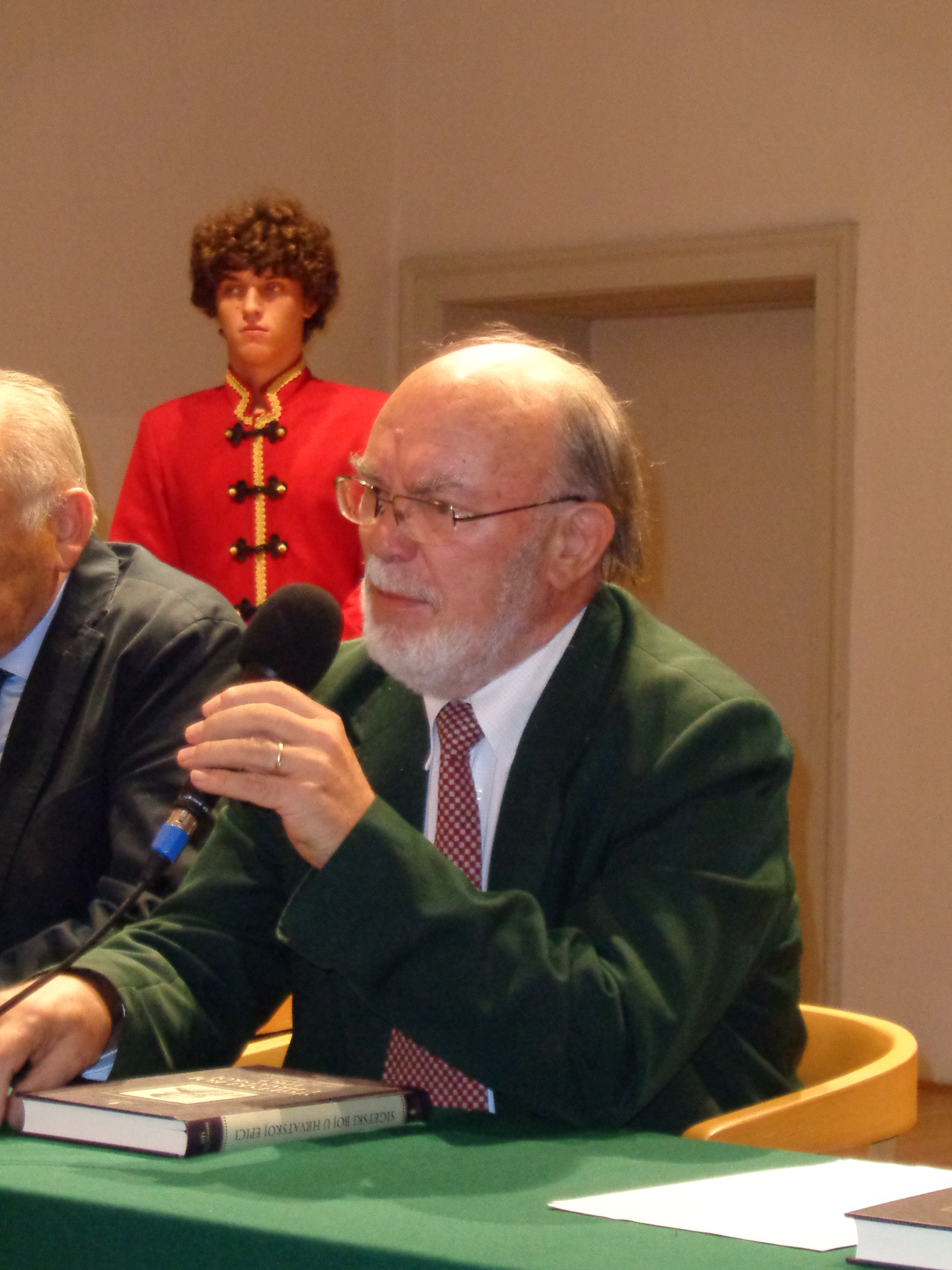
- Bratulić speaking at a 2017 book promotion event in Čakovec
- Born: 2 February 1939; Sveti Petar u Šumi, Province of Pola, Italy
- Occupation: former dean
- Known for: philology, literary history

Josip Bratulić (born 2 February 1939) is a Croatian philologist, historian of literature and culture, and academic.

He was born in Sveti Petar u Šumi. He attended a gymnasium in Pazin, graduating in Croatian studies and comparative literature at the Faculty of Philosophy in Zagreb. At the same university he received his master's degree and a doctorate, with a thesis on Croatian Glagolism. He worked as an assistant and research associate at the Old Church Slavonic Institute in Zagreb, and since 1977 he has been teaching a course on Old Croatian literature at the Zagreb Faculty of Philosophy. He served as a dean in the period 1991-1993, and since 2000 he has been a regular member of the Croatian Academy of Sciences and Arts.

Bratulić participated in the preparation of a large number of cultural and scientific events, such as the exhibition Pisana riječ u Hrvatskoj ("The Written Word in Croatia"), and the development of the ethnopark Glagolitic Alley Roč–Hum together with Želimir Janeš. In the period 1996-2002 he served as the president of Matica hrvatska. His scientific interest is Croatian and Slavic Middle Ages, Croatian Glagolitism, Croatian pre-revival literature and the Croatian cultural peculiarities on the Istrian territory.

== Works ==
Among many authored books, contributions, transliterations, translations, editing:

- Apokrif o prekrasnom Josipu u hrvatskoj književnosti (1972)
- Istarski razvod (1978)
- Prva hrvatskoglagoljska početnica 1527. (1983)
- Aleja glagoljaša Roč–Hum (1983, 1994)
- Žitja Konstantina i Metodija i druga vrela (1985)
- Prezimena i naselja u Istri I-III (1985-1986, with Petar Šimunović)
- Istarske književne teme (1987)
- Vinodolski zakon (1988)
- Izazov zavičaja (1990)
- Sjaj baštine (1990)
- Mrvice sa zagrebačkog stola (1994)
- Leksikon hrvatske glagoljice (1995)
- Hrvatska propovijed (1996)
- Istra: zavičaj starina i ljepota (2000)
- Pula: oduvijek (2001)
- "Ivan Milčetić o Ljudevitu Gaju i ilirskoj ideji u Hrvatskoj u prvoj polovici XIX. stoljeća" [Ivan Milčetić on Ljudevit Gaj and the Illyrian Idea in Croatia in the First Half of the 19th Century]. Zbornik o Ivanu Milčetiću, književnom povjesničaru, filologu i etnology (PDF). Znanstveni zbornici (in Serbo-Croatian). Vol. 7. Zagreb: Hrvatski studiji Sveučilišta u Zagrebu. 2002. pp. 65–76.
- Hrvatska pisana kultura I-III (2005-2008, with Stjepan Damjanović)
- Hrvatski ex libris (2007)
- Hrvatske autorske čestitke (2011)
- Slavonske književnopovijesne teme (2013)
- Pjesmarica Ane Katarine Zrinski (2014)
- Priče o lijepim stvarima ili Blagdan skromnih darova (2015)
- Hrvatske glagoljične i ćirilične isprave iz zbirke Stjepana Ivšića 1100. – 1527.: Acta Croatica (2017)
- Aleja glagoljaša: stoljeća hrvatske glagoljice (2019)
- Hrvatska glagoljica: Postanak, razvitak, značenje (2022)

Cultural offices
Preceded by Vlado Gotovac	President of Matica hrvatska 1996–2002	Succeeded by Igor Zidić
