= Schnepf =

Schnepf is a surname. Notable people with the surname include:

- Alicja Schnepf née Szczepaniak (1930–2025), Polish social activist honored with the title of Righteous Among the Nations
- Andrea Schnepf (born 1974), Austrian mathematician
- Andreas Schnepf (born 1968), German chemist
- Dorota Wysocka-Schnepf (born 1970), Polish journalist
- Eberhard Schnepf (1931–2016), German cell biologist
  - Compartmentalization rule also known as Schnepf's rule (Schnepf’sche Regel) or Schnepf's theorem (Schnepf’sches Theorem, Schnepfova teoréma)
- Erhard Schnepf (1495–1558), German Lutheran theologian
- Heinz Schnepf (1925–2007), German gymnast
- Maksymilian Sznepf (1920–2003), colonel of the Polish People's Army, one of the commanders of Augustów roundup, activist of the Jewish community in Poland
- Ryszard Schnepf (born 1951), Polish politician, former Ambassador of Poland to the United States
- Theodor or Dietrich Schnepf (1525–1586), German theology professor
