= Szczepanowski =

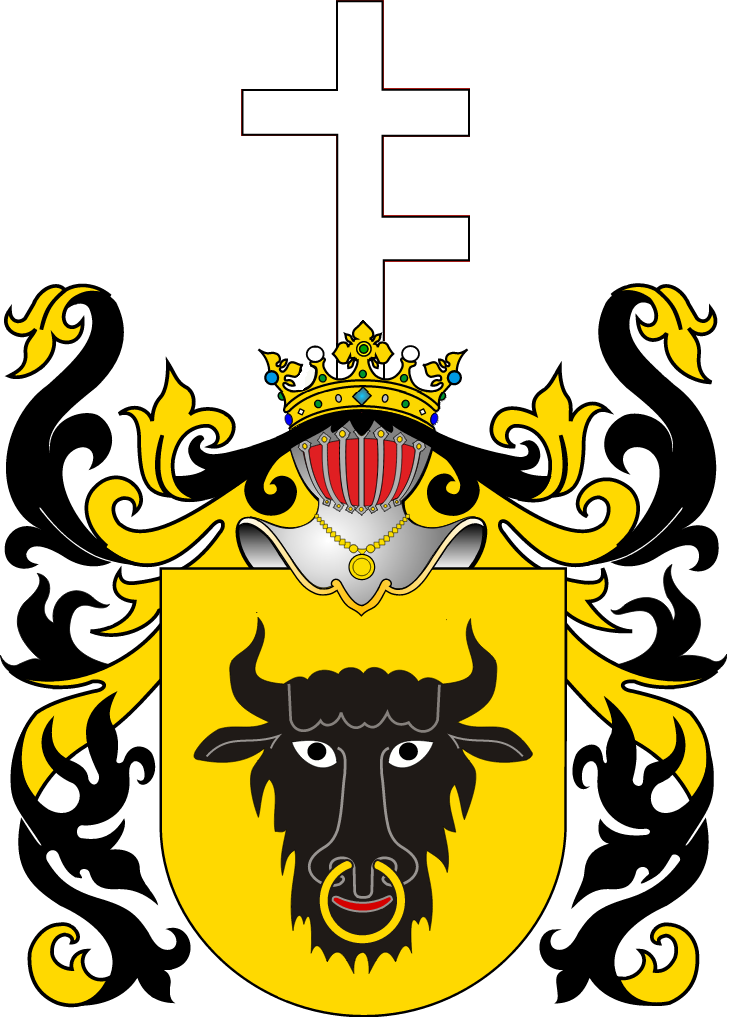
Szczepanowski coat of arms variation of Wieniawa coat of arms used by some of Szczepanowski family

Szczepanowski (feminine Szczepanowska, plural Szczepanowscy) is a Polish surname. It derived from the Szczepan (form of Stephen) root name. Some of them use Dąbrowa, Gryf, Prus or Wieniawa coat of arms. Notable people with the surname include:

- Juliana Szczepanowska (1825 – 1906), British concert pianist and author
- Marek Szczepanowski (born 1972), Polish diplomat and civil servant
- Stanislaw Szczepanowski, Stanislaus of Szczepanów (1030–1079), Polish Catholic prelate who served as Bishop of Kraków
- Stanisław Szczepanowski (1846–1900) was a Polish economist, engineer, businessman, and politician

== Other ==
- Dąbrówka Szczepanowska, village in the Tarnów County, Lesser Poland Voivodeship, southern Poland
