= Szczepan =

Szczepan is a Polish masculine given name, a form of Steven/Stephen, which means "wreath" or "crown". It may also be a surname. Notable people with the name include:

== Given name ==
- Szczepan of Wierzbna (died 1241), Polish nobleman
- Szczepan Bradło (died 1960), Polish farmer and Righteous Among the Nations
- Szczepan Hołowczyc (1741–1823), Polish archbishop and politician
- Szczepan Grajczyk (born 1931), Polish rower
- Szczepan Kończal (born 1985), Polish classical pianist
- Szczepan Kupczak (born 1992), Polish Nordic combined skier
- Szczepan Lewna (fl. 1980s), Polish politician and activist
- Szczepan Pieniążek (1913–2008), Polish pomologist
- Szczepan Sadurski (born 1965), Polish cartoonist, satirist, caricaturist and journalist
- Szczepan Ścibior (1903–1952), Polish soldier, pilot and patriot
- Szczepan Skomra (born 1949), Polish politician
- Szczepan Szczeniowski (1898–1979), Polish physicist and author
- Szczepan Twardoch (born 1979), Polish writer
- Szczepan Wesoły (1926–2018), Polish archbishop
- Szczepan Witkowski (1898–1937), Polish soldier and skier

== Surname ==
- Daniel Szczepan (born 1995), Polish footballer

== See also ==
- Szczepaniak
- Szczepański
- Szczepanowski
- Szczepanik
