= Szczepaniak =

Szczepaniak is a Polish surname. It derived from the Szczepan (form of Stephen) root name. Archaic feminine forms are Szczepaniakowa (by husband), Szczepaniakówna (by father); they still can be used colloquially. Notable people with the surname include:

- Alicja Schnepf née Szczepaniak (1930–2025), Polish social activist honored with the title of Righteous Among the Nations
- Ewa Kierzkowska née Szczepaniak (born 1964), Polish politician
- Jakub Szczepaniak (born 2003), Polish footballer
- Joanna Kozłowska-Szczepaniak (born 1959), Polish opera singer (soprano).
- Karolina Szczepaniak (born 1992), Polish swimmer
- Maciej Szczepaniak, Polish rally driver
- Mateusz Szczepaniak (born 1991), Polish footballer
- Mateusz Szczepaniak (born 2007), Polish footballer
- Mateusz Szczepaniak (born 1987), Polish speedway rider
- Michał Szczepaniak (born 1983), Polish speedway rider
- Pat Stevens née Szczepaniak (1945–2010), American actress
- Robert Szczepaniak (born 1942), French footballer
- Stanisław Szczepaniak (1934–2015), Polish biathlete
- Władysław Szczepaniak (1910–1979), Polish footballer
- Yannick Szczepaniak (born 1980), French sport wrestler

== See also ==
- 652031 Szczepaniak, minor planet
