= Szczepanik =

Szczepanik is a Polish surname. It derived from the Szczepan (form of Stephen) root name. Archaic feminine forms are Szczepanikowa (by husband), Szczepanikówna (by father); they still can be used colloquially. Notable people with the surname include:

- Edward Szczepanik (1915–2005), Polish economist
- Grzegorz Szczepanik (born 1953), Polish speedway racer
- Jan Szczepanik (1872–1926), Polish inventor
- Piotr Szczepanik (1942–2020), Polish singer
- Marian Szczepanik, immunologist and medical biologist
