= Szczepański =

Dołęga coat of arms used by some of Szczepański family

Szczepański (feminine Szczepańska, plural Szczepańscy) is a Polish surname. It derived from the Szczepan (form of Stephen) root name. Some of them use Dołęga or Pomian coat of arms. Notable people with the surname include:

- Aneta Szczepańska (born 1974), Polish judoka
- Bernard Szczepański (1945–2018), Polish wrestler
- Henryk Szczepański (1933–2015), Polish footballer
- Jan Szczepański (boxer) (1939–2017), Polish boxer
- Jan Szczepański (sociologist) (1913–2004), Polish sociologist
- Jan Alfred Szczepański (1902–1991), Polish film and theatre critic
- Jan Józef Szczepański (1919–2003), Polish writer, reporter, essayist, film scriptwriter and translator
- Jon Szczepanski, American soccer player
- Józef Szczepański (1922–1944), Polish poet
- Krystyna Szczepańska (born 1950), Polish stage and costume designer
- Krzysztof Szczepański, Polish canoer
- Magdalena Szczepańska (born 1980), Polish heptathlete
- Miłosz Szczepański (born 1998), Polish footballer
- Piotr Szczepański (born 1988), Polish canoer
- Reena Szczepanski (born 1976/1977), American politician
- Robert Szczepański (born 1975), Polish strongman
- Wiesław Szczepański (born 1960), Polish politician
- Władysław Szczepański (1877–1927) Polish priest, biblical scholar, archaeologist and orientalist, professor at the Pontifical Gregorian University in Rome and the University of Warsaw, author of Bible translations by Władysław Szczepański
