= List of minor planets: 652001–653000 =

The following is a partial list of minor planets, running from minor-planet number 652001 through 653000, inclusive. The primary data for this and other partial lists is based on JPL's "Small-Body Orbital Elements" and data available from the Minor Planet Center. Critical list information is also provided by the MPC, unless otherwise specified from Lowell Observatory. A detailed description of the table's columns and additional sources are given on the main page including a complete list of every page in this series, and a statistical break-up on the dynamical classification of minor planets.

Also see the summary list of all named bodies in numerical and alphabetical order, and the corresponding naming citations for the number range of this particular list. New namings may only be added to this list after official publication, as the preannouncement of names is condemned by the Working Group for Small Bodies Nomenclature of the International Astronomical Union.

Near-Earth obj.	MBA (inner)	MBA (outer)	Centaur
Mars-crosser	MBA (middle)	Jupiter trojan	Trans-Neptunian obj.
Unclassified

== 652001–652100 ==
Designation			Discovery			Properties		Ref
Permanent	Provisional	Named after	Date	Site	Discoverer(s)	Category	Diam.	Ref
652001	2013 RY_{12}	—	September 2, 2013	Palomar	Palomar Transient Factory	·	1.9 km	MPC · JPL
652002	2013 RF_{14}	—	August 28, 2013	Mount Lemmon	Mount Lemmon Survey	·	1.2 km	MPC · JPL
652003	2013 RJ_{14}	—	August 15, 2013	Haleakala	Pan-STARRS 1	·	1.2 km	MPC · JPL
652004	2013 RE_{15}	—	December 10, 2010	Mount Lemmon	Mount Lemmon Survey	·	1.3 km	MPC · JPL
652005	2013 RX_{17}	—	March 19, 2009	Mount Lemmon	Mount Lemmon Survey	·	630 m	MPC · JPL
652006	2013 RJ_{18}	—	August 2, 2013	Piszkéstető	K. Sárneczky	·	1.6 km	MPC · JPL
652007	2013 RX_{22}	—	September 3, 2013	Kitt Peak	Spacewatch	·	1.5 km	MPC · JPL
652008	2013 RL_{26}	—	September 3, 2013	Tincana	Zolnowski, M., Kusiak, M.	·	1.6 km	MPC · JPL
652009	2013 RW_{29}	—	October 9, 2010	Mount Lemmon	Mount Lemmon Survey	·	590 m	MPC · JPL
652010	2013 RA_{35}	—	August 10, 2004	Socorro	LINEAR	ADE	1.6 km	MPC · JPL
652011	2013 RC_{39}	—	September 3, 2013	Mount Lemmon	Mount Lemmon Survey	·	1.2 km	MPC · JPL
652012	2013 RZ_{42}	—	October 26, 2009	Mount Lemmon	Mount Lemmon Survey	EUN	1.0 km	MPC · JPL
652013	2013 RB_{45}	—	February 2, 2006	Catalina	CSS	·	2.0 km	MPC · JPL
652014	2013 RD_{53}	—	October 1, 2009	Mount Lemmon	Mount Lemmon Survey	·	1.5 km	MPC · JPL
652015	2013 RQ_{53}	—	September 28, 2001	Palomar	NEAT	L5	10 km	MPC · JPL
652016	2013 RV_{54}	—	November 24, 2009	Kitt Peak	Spacewatch	·	2.8 km	MPC · JPL
652017	2013 RS_{57}	—	February 25, 2011	Mount Lemmon	Mount Lemmon Survey	·	1.6 km	MPC · JPL
652018	2013 RL_{58}	—	August 4, 2003	Kitt Peak	Spacewatch	·	580 m	MPC · JPL
652019	2013 RF_{59}	—	August 23, 2004	Kitt Peak	Spacewatch	·	1.5 km	MPC · JPL
652020	2013 RN_{59}	—	September 10, 2013	Haleakala	Pan-STARRS 1	·	1.4 km	MPC · JPL
652021	2013 RL_{68}	—	September 4, 2013	Piszkéstető	K. Sárneczky	·	1.6 km	MPC · JPL
652022	2013 RC_{71}	—	December 16, 2007	Mount Lemmon	Mount Lemmon Survey	·	630 m	MPC · JPL
652023	2013 RD_{77}	—	February 25, 2011	Mount Lemmon	Mount Lemmon Survey	THM	2.4 km	MPC · JPL
652024	2013 RY_{77}	—	February 23, 2007	Mount Lemmon	Mount Lemmon Survey	·	1.2 km	MPC · JPL
652025	2013 RQ_{85}	—	August 23, 2007	Kitt Peak	Spacewatch	·	3.1 km	MPC · JPL
652026	2013 RH_{86}	—	May 25, 2012	ESA OGS	ESA OGS	·	2.0 km	MPC · JPL
652027	2013 RQ_{100}	—	September 9, 2013	Haleakala	Pan-STARRS 1	EUN	1.1 km	MPC · JPL
652028	2013 RB_{102}	—	September 3, 2013	Mount Lemmon	Mount Lemmon Survey	·	1.4 km	MPC · JPL
652029	2013 RR_{103}	—	September 4, 2013	Mount Lemmon	Mount Lemmon Survey	V	470 m	MPC · JPL
652030	2013 RS_{103}	—	September 1, 2013	Mount Lemmon	Mount Lemmon Survey	HNS	1.2 km	MPC · JPL
652031 Szczepaniak	2013 RS_{104}	Szczepaniak	September 3, 2013	Tincana	M. Kusiak, M. Żołnowski	ADE	2.1 km	MPC · JPL
652032	2013 RB_{108}	—	September 9, 2013	Haleakala	Pan-STARRS 1	·	570 m	MPC · JPL
652033	2013 RJ_{111}	—	September 14, 2013	Haleakala	Pan-STARRS 1	·	1.7 km	MPC · JPL
652034	2013 RE_{113}	—	May 5, 2016	Haleakala	Pan-STARRS 1	·	1.4 km	MPC · JPL
652035	2013 RE_{120}	—	October 18, 2014	Mount Lemmon	Mount Lemmon Survey	·	1.9 km	MPC · JPL
652036	2013 RL_{123}	—	September 14, 2013	Mount Lemmon	Mount Lemmon Survey	·	2.0 km	MPC · JPL
652037	2013 RD_{131}	—	September 6, 2013	Mount Lemmon	Mount Lemmon Survey	·	1.5 km	MPC · JPL
652038	2013 RX_{133}	—	September 1, 2013	Mount Lemmon	Mount Lemmon Survey	·	1.3 km	MPC · JPL
652039	2013 RW_{137}	—	September 14, 2013	Haleakala	Pan-STARRS 1	GEF	940 m	MPC · JPL
652040	2013 RQ_{138}	—	September 1, 2013	Haleakala	Pan-STARRS 1	·	1.7 km	MPC · JPL
652041	2013 RJ_{139}	—	September 9, 2013	Haleakala	Pan-STARRS 1	·	480 m	MPC · JPL
652042	2013 RV_{149}	—	September 9, 2013	Haleakala	Pan-STARRS 1	·	1.5 km	MPC · JPL
652043	2013 RP_{153}	—	September 6, 2013	Mount Lemmon	Mount Lemmon Survey	·	1.5 km	MPC · JPL
652044	2013 RA_{161}	—	September 3, 2013	Haleakala	Pan-STARRS 1	·	1.7 km	MPC · JPL
652045	2013 RD_{161}	—	May 29, 2012	Mount Lemmon	Mount Lemmon Survey	·	1.6 km	MPC · JPL
652046	2013 RT_{164}	—	September 10, 2013	Haleakala	Pan-STARRS 1	·	1.7 km	MPC · JPL
652047	2013 RD_{169}	—	September 10, 2013	Haleakala	Pan-STARRS 1	·	1.3 km	MPC · JPL
652048	2013 RR_{169}	—	September 12, 2013	Catalina	CSS	·	1.6 km	MPC · JPL
652049	2013 RW_{169}	—	September 10, 2013	Haleakala	Pan-STARRS 1	·	1.4 km	MPC · JPL
652050	2013 RQ_{171}	—	September 1, 2013	Haleakala	Pan-STARRS 1	·	1.0 km	MPC · JPL
652051	2013 RS_{171}	—	November 26, 2005	Kitt Peak	Spacewatch	·	1.1 km	MPC · JPL
652052	2013 RX_{172}	—	September 6, 2013	Mount Lemmon	Mount Lemmon Survey	·	1.4 km	MPC · JPL
652053	2013 SR_{1}	—	January 16, 2005	Kitt Peak	Spacewatch	·	630 m	MPC · JPL
652054	2013 SU_{12}	—	September 10, 2004	Kitt Peak	Spacewatch	·	1.4 km	MPC · JPL
652055	2013 SA_{17}	—	September 2, 2013	Mount Lemmon	Mount Lemmon Survey	·	1.3 km	MPC · JPL
652056	2013 SJ_{24}	—	September 29, 2005	Catalina	CSS	H	610 m	MPC · JPL
652057	2013 SD_{27}	—	September 21, 2003	Piszkéstető	K. Sárneczky, B. Sipőcz	·	550 m	MPC · JPL
652058	2013 SO_{30}	—	September 27, 2002	Palomar	NEAT	TIR	3.2 km	MPC · JPL
652059	2013 SW_{31}	—	September 1, 2013	Mount Lemmon	Mount Lemmon Survey	AGN	840 m	MPC · JPL
652060	2013 SC_{33}	—	February 25, 2011	Mount Lemmon	Mount Lemmon Survey	·	1.0 km	MPC · JPL
652061	2013 SQ_{37}	—	September 25, 2013	Mount Lemmon	Mount Lemmon Survey	AGN	860 m	MPC · JPL
652062	2013 SN_{39}	—	September 25, 2013	Mount Lemmon	Mount Lemmon Survey	KOR	900 m	MPC · JPL
652063	2013 SP_{42}	—	September 12, 2013	Catalina	CSS	·	1.6 km	MPC · JPL
652064	2013 SY_{42}	—	September 13, 2013	Catalina	CSS	·	2.0 km	MPC · JPL
652065	2013 SB_{48}	—	November 14, 2010	Mount Lemmon	Mount Lemmon Survey	·	560 m	MPC · JPL
652066	2013 SK_{52}	—	September 19, 2013	Haleakala	Pan-STARRS 1	·	3.0 km	MPC · JPL
652067	2013 SJ_{53}	—	April 4, 2011	Mount Lemmon	Mount Lemmon Survey	·	3.5 km	MPC · JPL
652068	2013 SZ_{55}	—	November 30, 2008	Kitt Peak	Spacewatch	·	3.3 km	MPC · JPL
652069	2013 SV_{57}	—	November 9, 2004	Mauna Kea	Veillet, C.	·	1.5 km	MPC · JPL
652070	2013 SX_{64}	—	February 26, 2011	Mount Lemmon	Mount Lemmon Survey	·	2.2 km	MPC · JPL
652071	2013 SK_{65}	—	September 3, 2013	Mount Lemmon	Mount Lemmon Survey	HOF	2.0 km	MPC · JPL
652072	2013 SD_{68}	—	September 24, 2013	Mount Lemmon	Mount Lemmon Survey	KOR	1.2 km	MPC · JPL
652073	2013 SF_{68}	—	September 24, 2013	Mount Lemmon	Mount Lemmon Survey	·	1.4 km	MPC · JPL
652074	2013 SL_{69}	—	September 2, 2013	Mount Lemmon	Mount Lemmon Survey	·	510 m	MPC · JPL
652075	2013 SW_{70}	—	December 10, 2005	Kitt Peak	Spacewatch	·	1.4 km	MPC · JPL
652076	2013 SJ_{74}	—	September 25, 2013	Mount Lemmon	Mount Lemmon Survey	HNS	960 m	MPC · JPL
652077	2013 SF_{76}	—	February 26, 2007	Mount Lemmon	Mount Lemmon Survey	·	1.3 km	MPC · JPL
652078	2013 SV_{84}	—	September 6, 2008	Mount Lemmon	Mount Lemmon Survey	·	1.7 km	MPC · JPL
652079	2013 SO_{85}	—	September 4, 2013	Palomar	Palomar Transient Factory	·	2.6 km	MPC · JPL
652080	2013 SC_{88}	—	September 3, 2013	Calar Alto	F. Hormuth	·	1.2 km	MPC · JPL
652081	2013 SZ_{97}	—	September 24, 2013	Mount Lemmon	Mount Lemmon Survey	·	1.5 km	MPC · JPL
652082	2013 SM_{98}	—	April 27, 2012	Haleakala	Pan-STARRS 1	·	1.7 km	MPC · JPL
652083	2013 SA_{102}	—	September 17, 2013	Mount Lemmon	Mount Lemmon Survey	·	500 m	MPC · JPL
652084	2013 SQ_{103}	—	May 1, 2017	Mount Lemmon	Mount Lemmon Survey	·	1.5 km	MPC · JPL
652085	2013 SU_{109}	—	September 28, 2013	Mount Lemmon	Mount Lemmon Survey	·	1.6 km	MPC · JPL
652086	2013 SL_{114}	—	September 26, 2013	Catalina	CSS	·	2.3 km	MPC · JPL
652087	2013 TU_{1}	—	February 10, 2011	Mount Lemmon	Mount Lemmon Survey	NEM	1.9 km	MPC · JPL
652088	2013 TN_{6}	—	September 14, 2013	Mount Lemmon	Mount Lemmon Survey	EUN	1.0 km	MPC · JPL
652089	2013 TK_{9}	—	August 23, 2003	Palomar	NEAT	·	590 m	MPC · JPL
652090	2013 TF_{12}	—	September 6, 2013	Kitt Peak	Spacewatch	·	430 m	MPC · JPL
652091	2013 TN_{21}	—	October 1, 2013	Mount Lemmon	Mount Lemmon Survey	·	1.3 km	MPC · JPL
652092	2013 TH_{23}	—	November 11, 2004	Kitt Peak	Spacewatch	·	2.0 km	MPC · JPL
652093	2013 TM_{25}	—	September 30, 2010	Mount Lemmon	Mount Lemmon Survey	·	620 m	MPC · JPL
652094	2013 TM_{27}	—	February 9, 2005	Kitt Peak	Spacewatch	THM	2.3 km	MPC · JPL
652095	2013 TO_{28}	—	September 17, 2013	Mount Lemmon	Mount Lemmon Survey	DOR	2.0 km	MPC · JPL
652096	2013 TW_{30}	—	October 11, 2004	Kitt Peak	Deep Ecliptic Survey	·	1.9 km	MPC · JPL
652097	2013 TO_{32}	—	September 28, 2003	Desert Eagle	W. K. Y. Yeung	·	600 m	MPC · JPL
652098	2013 TA_{34}	—	October 2, 2013	Kitt Peak	Spacewatch	·	1.7 km	MPC · JPL
652099	2013 TD_{40}	—	October 2, 2013	Mount Lemmon	Mount Lemmon Survey	·	1.4 km	MPC · JPL
652100	2013 TK_{40}	—	October 2, 2013	Mount Lemmon	Mount Lemmon Survey	·	540 m	MPC · JPL

== 652101–652200 ==
back to top

Designation			Discovery			Properties		Ref
Permanent	Provisional	Named after	Date	Site	Discoverer(s)	Category	Diam.	Ref
652101	2013 TU_{47}	—	October 3, 2013	Mount Lemmon	Mount Lemmon Survey	·	480 m	MPC · JPL
652102	2013 TU_{53}	—	July 25, 2008	Mount Lemmon	Mount Lemmon Survey	·	1.7 km	MPC · JPL
652103	2013 TZ_{54}	—	October 4, 2013	Mount Lemmon	Mount Lemmon Survey	·	1.4 km	MPC · JPL
652104	2013 TG_{57}	—	October 4, 2013	Mount Lemmon	Mount Lemmon Survey	·	1.2 km	MPC · JPL
652105	2013 TC_{58}	—	October 4, 2013	Mount Lemmon	Mount Lemmon Survey	·	1.3 km	MPC · JPL
652106	2013 TV_{58}	—	September 4, 2008	Kitt Peak	Spacewatch	HOF	2.0 km	MPC · JPL
652107	2013 TM_{59}	—	October 4, 2013	Mount Lemmon	Mount Lemmon Survey	·	570 m	MPC · JPL
652108	2013 TK_{63}	—	October 4, 2013	Mount Lemmon	Mount Lemmon Survey	HOF	1.7 km	MPC · JPL
652109	2013 TR_{70}	—	August 26, 2000	Kitt Peak	Spacewatch	·	1.4 km	MPC · JPL
652110	2013 TU_{74}	—	August 3, 2008	Siding Spring	SSS	·	1.6 km	MPC · JPL
652111	2013 TJ_{75}	—	September 29, 2008	Mount Lemmon	Mount Lemmon Survey	AGN	1.3 km	MPC · JPL
652112	2013 TL_{78}	—	March 29, 2011	Mount Lemmon	Mount Lemmon Survey	·	1.7 km	MPC · JPL
652113	2013 TS_{78}	—	October 5, 2013	Mount Lemmon	Mount Lemmon Survey	MRX	850 m	MPC · JPL
652114	2013 TR_{80}	—	September 11, 2013	Palomar	Palomar Transient Factory	·	600 m	MPC · JPL
652115	2013 TE_{83}	—	October 1, 2013	Kitt Peak	Spacewatch	·	1.7 km	MPC · JPL
652116	2013 TS_{92}	—	September 30, 2013	Catalina	CSS	·	680 m	MPC · JPL
652117	2013 TY_{92}	—	October 1, 2013	Kitt Peak	Spacewatch	·	560 m	MPC · JPL
652118	2013 TM_{94}	—	September 20, 2003	Palomar	NEAT	·	670 m	MPC · JPL
652119	2013 TJ_{96}	—	October 2, 2013	Kitt Peak	Spacewatch	·	1.8 km	MPC · JPL
652120	2013 TK_{100}	—	September 27, 2013	Haleakala	Pan-STARRS 1	·	460 m	MPC · JPL
652121	2013 TR_{100}	—	October 2, 2013	Mount Lemmon	Mount Lemmon Survey	·	1.5 km	MPC · JPL
652122	2013 TA_{105}	—	August 25, 2003	Cerro Tololo	Deep Ecliptic Survey	·	480 m	MPC · JPL
652123	2013 TR_{108}	—	September 20, 2008	Mount Lemmon	Mount Lemmon Survey	KOR	920 m	MPC · JPL
652124	2013 TK_{109}	—	August 17, 2006	Palomar	NEAT	·	630 m	MPC · JPL
652125	2013 TL_{112}	—	April 27, 2012	Haleakala	Pan-STARRS 1	·	620 m	MPC · JPL
652126	2013 TB_{113}	—	September 18, 2003	Kitt Peak	Spacewatch	·	430 m	MPC · JPL
652127	2013 TB_{119}	—	October 4, 2013	Mount Lemmon	Mount Lemmon Survey	·	1.8 km	MPC · JPL
652128	2013 TM_{120}	—	December 4, 2010	Catalina	CSS	·	680 m	MPC · JPL
652129	2013 TP_{122}	—	October 4, 2013	Catalina	CSS	·	1.7 km	MPC · JPL
652130	2013 TS_{126}	—	October 23, 2009	Mount Lemmon	Mount Lemmon Survey	·	5.1 km	MPC · JPL
652131	2013 TS_{131}	—	October 9, 2013	Catalina	CSS	·	1.6 km	MPC · JPL
652132	2013 TD_{132}	—	October 10, 2013	Elena Remote	Oreshko, A.	·	1.6 km	MPC · JPL
652133	2013 TO_{134}	—	September 29, 2002	Haleakala	NEAT	·	1.1 km	MPC · JPL
652134	2013 TX_{134}	—	September 17, 2003	Kitt Peak	Spacewatch	·	2.0 km	MPC · JPL
652135	2013 TQ_{136}	—	November 12, 1999	Kitt Peak	Spacewatch	PAL	1.6 km	MPC · JPL
652136	2013 TC_{139}	—	November 26, 2003	Kitt Peak	Spacewatch	·	1.7 km	MPC · JPL
652137	2013 TR_{148}	—	March 29, 2012	Mount Lemmon	Mount Lemmon Survey	·	980 m	MPC · JPL
652138	2013 TA_{150}	—	October 22, 2013	Mount Lemmon	Mount Lemmon Survey	·	1.2 km	MPC · JPL
652139	2013 TO_{150}	—	November 23, 2009	Mount Lemmon	Mount Lemmon Survey	·	1.2 km	MPC · JPL
652140	2013 TM_{153}	—	March 25, 2006	Mount Lemmon	Mount Lemmon Survey	·	1.6 km	MPC · JPL
652141	2013 TQ_{161}	—	October 1, 2013	Kitt Peak	Spacewatch	·	1.9 km	MPC · JPL
652142	2013 TT_{161}	—	October 2, 2013	Haleakala	Pan-STARRS 1	·	1.4 km	MPC · JPL
652143	2013 TD_{162}	—	October 2, 2013	Haleakala	Pan-STARRS 1	·	1.4 km	MPC · JPL
652144	2013 TA_{168}	—	February 1, 2006	Kitt Peak	Spacewatch	·	1.5 km	MPC · JPL
652145	2013 TL_{174}	—	October 3, 2013	Haleakala	Pan-STARRS 1	·	1.3 km	MPC · JPL
652146	2013 TE_{184}	—	October 3, 2013	Haleakala	Pan-STARRS 1	·	1.5 km	MPC · JPL
652147	2013 TP_{193}	—	October 12, 2013	Kitt Peak	Spacewatch	·	1.6 km	MPC · JPL
652148	2013 TC_{195}	—	October 13, 2013	Kitt Peak	Spacewatch	·	1.4 km	MPC · JPL
652149	2013 TZ_{195}	—	October 5, 2013	Haleakala	Pan-STARRS 1	·	580 m	MPC · JPL
652150	2013 TK_{200}	—	October 5, 2013	Haleakala	Pan-STARRS 1	GAL	1.2 km	MPC · JPL
652151	2013 TS_{200}	—	October 14, 2013	Mount Lemmon	Mount Lemmon Survey	·	620 m	MPC · JPL
652152	2013 TX_{213}	—	October 9, 2013	Kitt Peak	Spacewatch	KOR	1.1 km	MPC · JPL
652153	2013 TF_{217}	—	October 12, 2013	Kitt Peak	Spacewatch	·	490 m	MPC · JPL
652154	2013 TK_{217}	—	October 5, 2013	Haleakala	Pan-STARRS 1	·	520 m	MPC · JPL
652155	2013 TM_{218}	—	October 15, 2013	Mount Lemmon	Mount Lemmon Survey	·	1.5 km	MPC · JPL
652156	2013 TV_{218}	—	October 3, 2013	Mount Lemmon	Mount Lemmon Survey	·	1.3 km	MPC · JPL
652157	2013 TF_{220}	—	October 3, 2013	Mount Lemmon	Mount Lemmon Survey	·	1.2 km	MPC · JPL
652158	2013 TS_{220}	—	August 7, 2008	Kitt Peak	Spacewatch	NEM	1.7 km	MPC · JPL
652159	2013 TT_{225}	—	October 2, 2013	Mount Lemmon	Mount Lemmon Survey	·	1.3 km	MPC · JPL
652160	2013 TM_{230}	—	October 14, 2013	Mount Lemmon	Mount Lemmon Survey	·	1.3 km	MPC · JPL
652161	2013 TR_{232}	—	October 4, 2013	Mount Lemmon	Mount Lemmon Survey	·	1.8 km	MPC · JPL
652162	2013 TK_{237}	—	October 4, 2013	Mount Lemmon	Mount Lemmon Survey	·	1.5 km	MPC · JPL
652163	2013 TE_{238}	—	October 9, 2013	Mount Lemmon	Mount Lemmon Survey	AGN	900 m	MPC · JPL
652164	2013 TE_{239}	—	October 4, 2013	Mount Lemmon	Mount Lemmon Survey	(18466)	2.0 km	MPC · JPL
652165	2013 TV_{250}	—	October 2, 2013	Mount Lemmon	Mount Lemmon Survey	KOR	1.2 km	MPC · JPL
652166	2013 UG_{2}	—	October 3, 2008	La Sagra	OAM	H	450 m	MPC · JPL
652167	2013 UO_{4}	—	September 14, 2013	Mount Lemmon	Mount Lemmon Survey	·	670 m	MPC · JPL
652168	2013 UP_{9}	—	September 7, 2004	Palomar	NEAT	·	1.5 km	MPC · JPL
652169	2013 UE_{15}	—	November 16, 2003	Apache Point	SDSS	centaur	108 km	MPC · JPL
652170	2013 UD_{16}	—	November 20, 2008	Kitt Peak	Spacewatch	·	1.6 km	MPC · JPL
652171	2013 UR_{18}	—	October 24, 2013	Mount Lemmon	Mount Lemmon Survey	KOR	1.1 km	MPC · JPL
652172	2013 UH_{19}	—	November 23, 2009	Mount Lemmon	Mount Lemmon Survey	·	2.0 km	MPC · JPL
652173	2013 US_{21}	—	September 26, 2003	Apache Point	SDSS Collaboration	·	1.7 km	MPC · JPL
652174	2013 UJ_{31}	—	October 31, 2013	Kitt Peak	Spacewatch	·	510 m	MPC · JPL
652175	2013 UH_{34}	—	October 30, 2013	Haleakala	Pan-STARRS 1	·	440 m	MPC · JPL
652176	2013 UO_{34}	—	October 24, 2013	Mount Lemmon	Mount Lemmon Survey	·	1.7 km	MPC · JPL
652177	2013 UB_{35}	—	October 25, 2013	Mount Lemmon	Mount Lemmon Survey	·	1.4 km	MPC · JPL
652178	2013 UX_{35}	—	October 25, 2013	Mount Lemmon	Mount Lemmon Survey	·	1.8 km	MPC · JPL
652179	2013 UA_{36}	—	October 23, 2013	Mount Lemmon	Mount Lemmon Survey	·	1.5 km	MPC · JPL
652180	2013 UN_{42}	—	October 26, 2013	Mount Lemmon	Mount Lemmon Survey	·	490 m	MPC · JPL
652181	2013 UN_{44}	—	October 31, 2013	Kitt Peak	Spacewatch	·	1.5 km	MPC · JPL
652182	2013 UP_{45}	—	October 22, 2013	Haleakala	Pan-STARRS 1	·	1.5 km	MPC · JPL
652183	2013 UC_{48}	—	October 25, 2013	Kitt Peak	Spacewatch	·	1.5 km	MPC · JPL
652184	2013 UC_{50}	—	October 26, 2013	Catalina	CSS	H	380 m	MPC · JPL
652185	2013 UE_{50}	—	October 23, 2013	Mount Lemmon	Mount Lemmon Survey	KOR	1.1 km	MPC · JPL
652186	2013 UQ_{52}	—	October 26, 2013	Mount Lemmon	Mount Lemmon Survey	·	540 m	MPC · JPL
652187	2013 UV_{56}	—	August 24, 2003	Cerro Tololo	Deep Ecliptic Survey	KOR	920 m	MPC · JPL
652188	2013 UJ_{59}	—	October 24, 2013	Mount Lemmon	Mount Lemmon Survey	·	1.3 km	MPC · JPL
652189	2013 VN_{1}	—	March 19, 2007	Mount Lemmon	Mount Lemmon Survey	·	2.0 km	MPC · JPL
652190	2013 VV_{10}	—	November 20, 2003	Socorro	LINEAR	·	1.9 km	MPC · JPL
652191	2013 VM_{20}	—	November 8, 2013	Catalina	CSS	PHO	1.1 km	MPC · JPL
652192	2013 VZ_{22}	—	October 23, 2013	Kitt Peak	Spacewatch	·	640 m	MPC · JPL
652193	2013 VP_{23}	—	July 20, 2013	Haleakala	Pan-STARRS 1	·	720 m	MPC · JPL
652194	2013 VQ_{26}	—	October 10, 2008	Mount Lemmon	Mount Lemmon Survey	·	1.9 km	MPC · JPL
652195	2013 VS_{26}	—	November 8, 2013	Mount Lemmon	Mount Lemmon Survey	HOF	1.9 km	MPC · JPL
652196	2013 VM_{27}	—	September 29, 2013	Mount Lemmon	Mount Lemmon Survey	·	2.2 km	MPC · JPL
652197	2013 VB_{28}	—	June 2, 2006	Kitt Peak	Spacewatch	KOR	1.3 km	MPC · JPL
652198	2013 VD_{29}	—	November 9, 2013	Mount Lemmon	Mount Lemmon Survey	·	1.8 km	MPC · JPL
652199	2013 VX_{31}	—	November 10, 2013	Mount Lemmon	Mount Lemmon Survey	HOF	2.3 km	MPC · JPL
652200	2013 VC_{34}	—	November 9, 2013	Haleakala	Pan-STARRS 1	L5	7.1 km	MPC · JPL

== 652201–652300 ==
back to top

Designation			Discovery			Properties		Ref
Permanent	Provisional	Named after	Date	Site	Discoverer(s)	Category	Diam.	Ref
652201	2013 VM_{43}	—	November 7, 2013	Kitt Peak	Spacewatch	·	1.6 km	MPC · JPL
652202	2013 VP_{50}	—	November 14, 2013	Mount Lemmon	Mount Lemmon Survey	·	500 m	MPC · JPL
652203	2013 VM_{53}	—	November 7, 2013	Calar Alto-CASADO	Proffe, G., Hellmich, S.	·	1.3 km	MPC · JPL
652204	2013 VP_{55}	—	November 9, 2013	Kitt Peak	Spacewatch	·	1.6 km	MPC · JPL
652205	2013 VU_{55}	—	November 9, 2013	Haleakala	Pan-STARRS 1	·	470 m	MPC · JPL
652206	2013 VS_{58}	—	November 9, 2013	Haleakala	Pan-STARRS 1	3:2	3.9 km	MPC · JPL
652207	2013 VE_{66}	—	November 6, 2013	Haleakala	Pan-STARRS 1	·	1.6 km	MPC · JPL
652208	2013 VS_{68}	—	October 20, 2008	Mount Lemmon	Mount Lemmon Survey	·	1.3 km	MPC · JPL
652209	2013 VU_{68}	—	November 9, 2013	Haleakala	Pan-STARRS 1	·	1.6 km	MPC · JPL
652210	2013 VA_{69}	—	November 18, 2008	Kitt Peak	Spacewatch	KOR	1.2 km	MPC · JPL
652211	2013 VT_{69}	—	November 9, 2013	Haleakala	Pan-STARRS 1	·	1.3 km	MPC · JPL
652212	2013 VB_{80}	—	November 9, 2013	Haleakala	Pan-STARRS 1	·	1.5 km	MPC · JPL
652213	2013 VF_{80}	—	November 2, 2013	Mount Lemmon	Mount Lemmon Survey	KOR	1.1 km	MPC · JPL
652214	2013 VK_{81}	—	November 9, 2013	Mount Lemmon	Mount Lemmon Survey	·	1.7 km	MPC · JPL
652215	2013 WO	—	November 23, 2013	Haleakala	Pan-STARRS 1	H	350 m	MPC · JPL
652216	2013 WO_{1}	—	November 4, 2013	XuYi	PMO NEO Survey Program	·	600 m	MPC · JPL
652217	2013 WE_{7}	—	November 9, 2013	Haleakala	Pan-STARRS 1	DOR	1.7 km	MPC · JPL
652218	2013 WD_{8}	—	November 26, 2013	Mount Lemmon	Mount Lemmon Survey	·	1.4 km	MPC · JPL
652219	2013 WZ_{8}	—	November 2, 2013	Mount Lemmon	Mount Lemmon Survey	·	2.3 km	MPC · JPL
652220	2013 WR_{10}	—	April 27, 2012	Haleakala	Pan-STARRS 1	·	730 m	MPC · JPL
652221	2013 WU_{11}	—	September 23, 2008	Mount Lemmon	Mount Lemmon Survey	·	1.9 km	MPC · JPL
652222	2013 WB_{13}	—	November 24, 2009	Kitt Peak	Spacewatch	·	920 m	MPC · JPL
652223 Huangtushui	2013 WD_{13}	Huangtushui	August 28, 2006	Lulin	LUSS	·	760 m	MPC · JPL
652224	2013 WA_{14}	—	January 9, 2006	Kitt Peak	Spacewatch	·	1.2 km	MPC · JPL
652225	2013 WQ_{18}	—	September 24, 2008	Kitt Peak	Spacewatch	·	1.3 km	MPC · JPL
652226	2013 WB_{19}	—	November 27, 2013	Haleakala	Pan-STARRS 1	·	1.8 km	MPC · JPL
652227	2013 WY_{19}	—	October 23, 2008	Kitt Peak	Spacewatch	·	1.8 km	MPC · JPL
652228	2013 WE_{21}	—	August 4, 2003	Kitt Peak	Spacewatch	·	2.1 km	MPC · JPL
652229	2013 WR_{23}	—	November 27, 2013	Haleakala	Pan-STARRS 1	·	550 m	MPC · JPL
652230	2013 WR_{26}	—	October 14, 2013	Mount Lemmon	Mount Lemmon Survey	·	1.6 km	MPC · JPL
652231	2013 WA_{32}	—	November 26, 2013	Haleakala	Pan-STARRS 1	HOF	1.6 km	MPC · JPL
652232	2013 WC_{37}	—	November 27, 2013	Haleakala	Pan-STARRS 1	·	470 m	MPC · JPL
652233	2013 WU_{38}	—	October 28, 2013	Kitt Peak	Spacewatch	·	1.4 km	MPC · JPL
652234	2013 WD_{40}	—	November 2, 2013	Mount Lemmon	Mount Lemmon Survey	·	1.6 km	MPC · JPL
652235	2013 WN_{42}	—	September 25, 2006	Kitt Peak	Spacewatch	·	470 m	MPC · JPL
652236	2013 WH_{44}	—	May 19, 2012	Haleakala	Pan-STARRS 1	H	390 m	MPC · JPL
652237	2013 WK_{48}	—	October 10, 2008	Mount Lemmon	Mount Lemmon Survey	·	1.9 km	MPC · JPL
652238	2013 WU_{51}	—	November 11, 2013	Catalina	CSS	BRA	1.5 km	MPC · JPL
652239	2013 WZ_{56}	—	November 12, 2013	Kitt Peak	Spacewatch	·	1.8 km	MPC · JPL
652240	2013 WO_{59}	—	December 14, 2010	Mount Lemmon	Mount Lemmon Survey	·	500 m	MPC · JPL
652241	2013 WK_{63}	—	November 28, 2013	Haleakala	Pan-STARRS 1	·	2.2 km	MPC · JPL
652242	2013 WB_{65}	—	December 19, 2001	Palomar	NEAT	·	1.2 km	MPC · JPL
652243	2013 WB_{67}	—	November 17, 2006	Kitt Peak	Spacewatch	V	670 m	MPC · JPL
652244	2013 WL_{68}	—	October 14, 2004	Palomar	NEAT	·	2.5 km	MPC · JPL
652245	2013 WW_{71}	—	September 26, 2006	Mount Lemmon	Mount Lemmon Survey	·	460 m	MPC · JPL
652246	2013 WP_{73}	—	December 8, 2010	Mount Lemmon	Mount Lemmon Survey	·	580 m	MPC · JPL
652247	2013 WO_{75}	—	November 8, 2013	Mount Lemmon	Mount Lemmon Survey	AGN	920 m	MPC · JPL
652248	2013 WL_{80}	—	November 26, 2013	Mount Lemmon	Mount Lemmon Survey	(5)	1.0 km	MPC · JPL
652249	2013 WY_{83}	—	October 9, 2013	Mount Lemmon	Mount Lemmon Survey	·	910 m	MPC · JPL
652250	2013 WE_{85}	—	January 11, 2002	Anderson Mesa	LONEOS	EUN	1.2 km	MPC · JPL
652251	2013 WH_{85}	—	October 20, 2003	Palomar	NEAT	·	630 m	MPC · JPL
652252	2013 WV_{85}	—	September 16, 2003	Kitt Peak	Spacewatch	AGN	1.0 km	MPC · JPL
652253	2013 WG_{87}	—	November 27, 2013	Haleakala	Pan-STARRS 1	·	1.6 km	MPC · JPL
652254	2013 WT_{89}	—	September 23, 2008	Mount Lemmon	Mount Lemmon Survey	HOF	1.9 km	MPC · JPL
652255	2013 WC_{91}	—	December 30, 2007	Kitt Peak	Spacewatch	·	660 m	MPC · JPL
652256	2013 WS_{91}	—	November 28, 2013	Mount Lemmon	Mount Lemmon Survey	·	490 m	MPC · JPL
652257	2013 WB_{92}	—	November 8, 2013	Mount Lemmon	Mount Lemmon Survey	·	1.7 km	MPC · JPL
652258	2013 WR_{92}	—	April 30, 2011	Mount Lemmon	Mount Lemmon Survey	·	1.9 km	MPC · JPL
652259	2013 WE_{96}	—	November 12, 2013	Kitt Peak	Spacewatch	615	1.2 km	MPC · JPL
652260	2013 WV_{97}	—	November 28, 2013	Mount Lemmon	Mount Lemmon Survey	·	1.7 km	MPC · JPL
652261	2013 WV_{99}	—	November 29, 2013	Haleakala	Pan-STARRS 1	·	620 m	MPC · JPL
652262	2013 WS_{101}	—	August 24, 2005	Palomar	NEAT	·	1.6 km	MPC · JPL
652263	2013 WO_{102}	—	November 19, 2008	Kitt Peak	Spacewatch	·	1.3 km	MPC · JPL
652264	2013 WS_{103}	—	October 8, 2013	Mount Lemmon	Mount Lemmon Survey	·	490 m	MPC · JPL
652265	2013 WQ_{105}	—	October 10, 2004	Palomar	NEAT	·	1.9 km	MPC · JPL
652266	2013 WW_{110}	—	October 9, 2013	Mount Lemmon	Mount Lemmon Survey	·	1.4 km	MPC · JPL
652267	2013 WY_{110}	—	September 29, 2008	Mount Lemmon	Mount Lemmon Survey	·	2.1 km	MPC · JPL
652268	2013 WO_{111}	—	November 27, 2013	Haleakala	Pan-STARRS 1	·	2.1 km	MPC · JPL
652269	2013 WF_{113}	—	November 28, 2013	ASC-Kislovodsk	Nevski, V.	·	1.4 km	MPC · JPL
652270	2013 WQ_{113}	—	October 14, 2013	Mount Lemmon	Mount Lemmon Survey	AGN	1.2 km	MPC · JPL
652271	2013 WU_{113}	—	November 27, 2013	Haleakala	Pan-STARRS 1	GAL	1.8 km	MPC · JPL
652272	2013 WV_{115}	—	November 29, 2013	Mount Lemmon	Mount Lemmon Survey	·	1.3 km	MPC · JPL
652273	2013 WZ_{116}	—	February 5, 2016	Haleakala	Pan-STARRS 1	·	1.8 km	MPC · JPL
652274	2013 WC_{118}	—	November 27, 2013	Haleakala	Pan-STARRS 1	·	1.1 km	MPC · JPL
652275	2013 WT_{125}	—	February 16, 2010	Kitt Peak	Spacewatch	·	1.7 km	MPC · JPL
652276	2013 WX_{125}	—	November 28, 2013	Mount Lemmon	Mount Lemmon Survey	KOR	1.2 km	MPC · JPL
652277	2013 WN_{127}	—	November 27, 2013	Haleakala	Pan-STARRS 1	·	2.2 km	MPC · JPL
652278	2013 WZ_{127}	—	November 27, 2013	Haleakala	Pan-STARRS 1	615	1.1 km	MPC · JPL
652279	2013 WH_{129}	—	November 29, 2013	Mount Lemmon	Mount Lemmon Survey	·	2.4 km	MPC · JPL
652280	2013 WV_{129}	—	November 28, 2013	Mount Lemmon	Mount Lemmon Survey	KOR	1.2 km	MPC · JPL
652281	2013 WM_{133}	—	November 26, 2013	Haleakala	Pan-STARRS 1	·	1.4 km	MPC · JPL
652282	2013 WR_{135}	—	November 27, 2013	Haleakala	Pan-STARRS 1	·	1.8 km	MPC · JPL
652283	2013 WM_{136}	—	November 26, 2013	Catalina	CSS	GAL	1.4 km	MPC · JPL
652284	2013 WJ_{141}	—	November 27, 2013	Haleakala	Pan-STARRS 1	·	680 m	MPC · JPL
652285	2013 WT_{142}	—	November 28, 2013	Kitt Peak	Spacewatch	·	2.0 km	MPC · JPL
652286	2013 WZ_{142}	—	November 28, 2013	Mount Lemmon	Mount Lemmon Survey	·	1.6 km	MPC · JPL
652287	2013 XL_{2}	—	November 26, 2013	Haleakala	Pan-STARRS 1	·	1.8 km	MPC · JPL
652288	2013 XB_{5}	—	September 28, 2013	Mount Lemmon	Mount Lemmon Survey	·	1.3 km	MPC · JPL
652289	2013 XS_{6}	—	November 7, 2013	Mount Lemmon	Mount Lemmon Survey	·	2.1 km	MPC · JPL
652290	2013 XK_{13}	—	October 8, 2008	Kitt Peak	Spacewatch	·	1.4 km	MPC · JPL
652291	2013 XY_{19}	—	December 11, 2013	Mount Lemmon	Mount Lemmon Survey	·	2.2 km	MPC · JPL
652292	2013 XZ_{28}	—	December 5, 2013	Mayhill-ISON	L. Elenin	·	1.9 km	MPC · JPL
652293	2013 XA_{30}	—	December 3, 2013	Haleakala	Pan-STARRS 1	·	2.0 km	MPC · JPL
652294	2013 XL_{32}	—	December 14, 2013	Mount Lemmon	Mount Lemmon Survey	·	1.7 km	MPC · JPL
652295	2013 XB_{33}	—	December 3, 2013	Mount Lemmon	Mount Lemmon Survey	·	1.7 km	MPC · JPL
652296	2013 XD_{33}	—	December 11, 2013	Haleakala	Pan-STARRS 1	·	2.0 km	MPC · JPL
652297	2013 XE_{33}	—	November 28, 2013	Mount Lemmon	Mount Lemmon Survey	·	1.4 km	MPC · JPL
652298	2013 XP_{33}	—	December 11, 2013	Haleakala	Pan-STARRS 1	·	1.4 km	MPC · JPL
652299	2013 XE_{35}	—	December 13, 2013	Mount Lemmon	Mount Lemmon Survey	·	2.4 km	MPC · JPL
652300	2013 XU_{35}	—	December 13, 2013	Mount Lemmon	Mount Lemmon Survey	·	2.3 km	MPC · JPL

== 652301–652400 ==
back to top

Designation			Discovery			Properties		Ref
Permanent	Provisional	Named after	Date	Site	Discoverer(s)	Category	Diam.	Ref
652301	2013 XW_{39}	—	December 10, 2013	Mount Lemmon	Mount Lemmon Survey	·	1.7 km	MPC · JPL
652302	2013 XQ_{41}	—	December 7, 2013	Haleakala	Pan-STARRS 1	EOS	1.4 km	MPC · JPL
652303	2013 YO_{1}	—	July 18, 2012	Mayhill-ISON	L. Elenin	·	820 m	MPC · JPL
652304	2013 YU_{3}	—	February 17, 2010	Mount Lemmon	Mount Lemmon Survey	KOR	1.2 km	MPC · JPL
652305	2013 YN_{4}	—	February 23, 2007	Mount Lemmon	Mount Lemmon Survey	MAS	600 m	MPC · JPL
652306	2013 YV_{6}	—	November 10, 2013	Mount Lemmon	Mount Lemmon Survey	·	630 m	MPC · JPL
652307	2013 YL_{8}	—	April 4, 2011	Kitt Peak	Spacewatch	·	2.2 km	MPC · JPL
652308	2013 YM_{10}	—	November 9, 2007	Kitt Peak	Spacewatch	·	2.1 km	MPC · JPL
652309	2013 YT_{10}	—	December 11, 2013	Mount Lemmon	Mount Lemmon Survey	H	500 m	MPC · JPL
652310	2013 YK_{12}	—	January 1, 2003	Needville	Castillo, L., Dillon, W. G.	·	1.5 km	MPC · JPL
652311	2013 YE_{13}	—	February 14, 2005	Junk Bond	D. Healy	KOR	1.5 km	MPC · JPL
652312	2013 YJ_{13}	—	November 27, 2013	Haleakala	Pan-STARRS 1	·	690 m	MPC · JPL
652313	2013 YG_{20}	—	December 25, 2013	Haleakala	Pan-STARRS 1	H	440 m	MPC · JPL
652314	2013 YY_{21}	—	October 2, 2008	Mount Lemmon	Mount Lemmon Survey	MRX	990 m	MPC · JPL
652315	2013 YF_{23}	—	March 24, 2003	Kitt Peak	Spacewatch	·	1.2 km	MPC · JPL
652316	2013 YC_{24}	—	February 29, 2008	XuYi	PMO NEO Survey Program	·	730 m	MPC · JPL
652317	2013 YH_{25}	—	February 12, 2011	Catalina	CSS	PHO	900 m	MPC · JPL
652318	2013 YA_{27}	—	May 3, 2008	Mount Lemmon	Mount Lemmon Survey	·	560 m	MPC · JPL
652319	2013 YX_{28}	—	September 7, 2004	Kitt Peak	Spacewatch	·	940 m	MPC · JPL
652320	2013 YH_{31}	—	December 25, 2013	Mount Lemmon	Mount Lemmon Survey	KOR	1.0 km	MPC · JPL
652321	2013 YJ_{31}	—	November 20, 2008	Kitt Peak	Spacewatch	·	1.8 km	MPC · JPL
652322	2013 YR_{31}	—	August 24, 2001	Kitt Peak	Spacewatch	·	1.8 km	MPC · JPL
652323	2013 YG_{32}	—	September 3, 2008	Kitt Peak	Spacewatch	L4	9.7 km	MPC · JPL
652324	2013 YX_{38}	—	November 17, 2006	Mount Lemmon	Mount Lemmon Survey	·	550 m	MPC · JPL
652325	2013 YY_{38}	—	September 3, 2008	Kitt Peak	Spacewatch	·	1.9 km	MPC · JPL
652326	2013 YE_{39}	—	December 21, 2006	Mount Lemmon	Mount Lemmon Survey	·	940 m	MPC · JPL
652327	2013 YF_{40}	—	October 21, 2003	Kitt Peak	Spacewatch	AGN	1.1 km	MPC · JPL
652328	2013 YB_{44}	—	December 26, 2013	Haleakala	Pan-STARRS 1	EOS	1.6 km	MPC · JPL
652329	2013 YF_{47}	—	December 27, 2013	XuYi	PMO NEO Survey Program	·	1.5 km	MPC · JPL
652330	2013 YT_{47}	—	December 30, 2008	Mount Lemmon	Mount Lemmon Survey	·	1.5 km	MPC · JPL
652331	2013 YX_{48}	—	December 24, 2013	Mount Lemmon	Mount Lemmon Survey	·	590 m	MPC · JPL
652332	2013 YK_{49}	—	December 24, 2013	Mount Lemmon	Mount Lemmon Survey	·	750 m	MPC · JPL
652333	2013 YK_{55}	—	May 21, 2006	Siding Spring	SSS	·	2.0 km	MPC · JPL
652334	2013 YA_{56}	—	November 19, 2003	Catalina	CSS	·	2.1 km	MPC · JPL
652335	2013 YB_{58}	—	November 28, 2013	Mount Lemmon	Mount Lemmon Survey	·	1.7 km	MPC · JPL
652336	2013 YK_{59}	—	August 26, 2012	Haleakala	Pan-STARRS 1	·	1.4 km	MPC · JPL
652337	2013 YU_{61}	—	November 27, 2006	Mount Lemmon	Mount Lemmon Survey	·	770 m	MPC · JPL
652338	2013 YJ_{69}	—	December 13, 2013	Mount Lemmon	Mount Lemmon Survey	·	2.4 km	MPC · JPL
652339	2013 YB_{71}	—	December 25, 2013	Mount Lemmon	Mount Lemmon Survey	·	1.3 km	MPC · JPL
652340	2013 YE_{71}	—	November 27, 2013	Haleakala	Pan-STARRS 1	·	1.5 km	MPC · JPL
652341	2013 YW_{72}	—	February 1, 2009	Mount Lemmon	Mount Lemmon Survey	·	1.6 km	MPC · JPL
652342	2013 YQ_{74}	—	September 17, 2006	Kitt Peak	Spacewatch	·	540 m	MPC · JPL
652343	2013 YT_{75}	—	December 26, 2013	Mount Lemmon	Mount Lemmon Survey	·	2.4 km	MPC · JPL
652344	2013 YA_{76}	—	January 18, 2009	Kitt Peak	Spacewatch	·	2.0 km	MPC · JPL
652345	2013 YB_{76}	—	August 30, 2000	Kitt Peak	Spacewatch	·	860 m	MPC · JPL
652346	2013 YT_{76}	—	April 13, 2002	Palomar	NEAT	·	1.7 km	MPC · JPL
652347	2013 YW_{76}	—	September 11, 2012	ASC-Kislovodsk	ASC-Kislovodsk	·	2.7 km	MPC · JPL
652348	2013 YG_{77}	—	March 27, 2003	Palomar	NEAT	·	1.4 km	MPC · JPL
652349	2013 YE_{81}	—	September 22, 2000	Kitt Peak	Spacewatch	(5)	990 m	MPC · JPL
652350	2013 YR_{81}	—	November 25, 2006	Kitt Peak	Spacewatch	·	550 m	MPC · JPL
652351	2013 YK_{82}	—	December 23, 2013	Mount Lemmon	Mount Lemmon Survey	·	580 m	MPC · JPL
652352	2013 YN_{83}	—	October 10, 2012	Mount Lemmon	Mount Lemmon Survey	·	2.2 km	MPC · JPL
652353	2013 YF_{84}	—	December 28, 2013	Kitt Peak	Spacewatch	EOS	1.6 km	MPC · JPL
652354	2013 YX_{84}	—	December 28, 2013	Kitt Peak	Spacewatch	·	2.0 km	MPC · JPL
652355	2013 YM_{86}	—	December 28, 2013	Kitt Peak	Spacewatch	·	1.3 km	MPC · JPL
652356	2013 YJ_{87}	—	December 28, 2013	Kitt Peak	Spacewatch	·	2.2 km	MPC · JPL
652357	2013 YM_{89}	—	December 4, 2008	Kitt Peak	Spacewatch	·	1.6 km	MPC · JPL
652358	2013 YG_{90}	—	October 10, 2007	Kitt Peak	Spacewatch	·	1.4 km	MPC · JPL
652359	2013 YX_{90}	—	November 15, 2006	Mount Lemmon	Mount Lemmon Survey	·	590 m	MPC · JPL
652360	2013 YA_{95}	—	October 8, 2012	Haleakala	Pan-STARRS 1	·	2.2 km	MPC · JPL
652361	2013 YW_{95}	—	October 15, 2012	Haleakala	Pan-STARRS 1	·	1.8 km	MPC · JPL
652362	2013 YC_{96}	—	January 31, 2009	Kitt Peak	Spacewatch	·	1.6 km	MPC · JPL
652363	2013 YT_{100}	—	September 27, 2006	Catalina	CSS	·	670 m	MPC · JPL
652364	2013 YG_{101}	—	December 31, 2013	Mount Lemmon	Mount Lemmon Survey	·	1.8 km	MPC · JPL
652365	2013 YC_{106}	—	October 9, 2012	Mount Lemmon	Mount Lemmon Survey	·	1.8 km	MPC · JPL
652366	2013 YO_{107}	—	November 28, 2013	Mount Lemmon	Mount Lemmon Survey	·	1.8 km	MPC · JPL
652367	2013 YM_{108}	—	September 17, 2006	Kitt Peak	Spacewatch	·	450 m	MPC · JPL
652368	2013 YP_{109}	—	November 8, 2009	Mount Lemmon	Mount Lemmon Survey	NYS	780 m	MPC · JPL
652369	2013 YP_{110}	—	December 27, 2013	Kitt Peak	Spacewatch	·	530 m	MPC · JPL
652370	2013 YO_{112}	—	October 8, 2012	Mount Lemmon	Mount Lemmon Survey	·	1.5 km	MPC · JPL
652371	2013 YV_{113}	—	May 3, 2003	Kitt Peak	Spacewatch	·	1.1 km	MPC · JPL
652372	2013 YW_{115}	—	December 30, 2013	Kitt Peak	Spacewatch	·	1.6 km	MPC · JPL
652373	2013 YO_{117}	—	March 5, 2006	Kitt Peak	Spacewatch	·	1.9 km	MPC · JPL
652374	2013 YP_{118}	—	October 7, 2012	Haleakala	Pan-STARRS 1	·	1.7 km	MPC · JPL
652375	2013 YZ_{118}	—	December 30, 2013	Haleakala	Pan-STARRS 1	·	2.2 km	MPC · JPL
652376	2013 YQ_{119}	—	January 1, 2009	Kitt Peak	Spacewatch	·	1.1 km	MPC · JPL
652377	2013 YY_{119}	—	December 22, 2008	Mount Lemmon	Mount Lemmon Survey	·	1.5 km	MPC · JPL
652378	2013 YB_{121}	—	August 5, 2008	La Sagra	OAM	·	1.3 km	MPC · JPL
652379	2013 YK_{121}	—	March 2, 2006	Kitt Peak	Wasserman, L. H., Millis, R. L.	(29841)	1.4 km	MPC · JPL
652380	2013 YL_{121}	—	December 24, 2013	Mount Lemmon	Mount Lemmon Survey	·	1.6 km	MPC · JPL
652381	2013 YM_{121}	—	October 23, 2001	Palomar	NEAT	·	1.4 km	MPC · JPL
652382	2013 YV_{122}	—	March 4, 2005	Mount Lemmon	Mount Lemmon Survey	·	1.7 km	MPC · JPL
652383	2013 YZ_{122}	—	September 15, 2007	Mount Lemmon	Mount Lemmon Survey	KOR	1.3 km	MPC · JPL
652384	2013 YH_{123}	—	December 5, 2007	Kitt Peak	Spacewatch	·	2.9 km	MPC · JPL
652385	2013 YU_{130}	—	September 24, 2012	Mount Lemmon	Mount Lemmon Survey	TEL	980 m	MPC · JPL
652386	2013 YY_{131}	—	December 31, 2013	Mount Lemmon	Mount Lemmon Survey	EOS	1.3 km	MPC · JPL
652387	2013 YL_{134}	—	October 15, 2012	Haleakala	Pan-STARRS 1	EOS	1.4 km	MPC · JPL
652388	2013 YZ_{134}	—	January 1, 2009	Mount Lemmon	Mount Lemmon Survey	EOS	1.6 km	MPC · JPL
652389	2013 YT_{137}	—	December 6, 2013	Haleakala	Pan-STARRS 1	·	1.4 km	MPC · JPL
652390	2013 YT_{142}	—	September 28, 2008	Mount Lemmon	Mount Lemmon Survey	GEF	1.2 km	MPC · JPL
652391	2013 YY_{142}	—	October 12, 2009	Mount Lemmon	Mount Lemmon Survey	·	1.2 km	MPC · JPL
652392	2013 YD_{148}	—	December 30, 2013	Kitt Peak	Spacewatch	V	480 m	MPC · JPL
652393	2013 YS_{150}	—	December 11, 2013	Catalina	CSS	·	2.5 km	MPC · JPL
652394	2013 YD_{152}	—	December 10, 2013	Mount Lemmon	Mount Lemmon Survey	·	2.0 km	MPC · JPL
652395	2013 YK_{155}	—	January 27, 2007	Mount Lemmon	Mount Lemmon Survey	NYS	750 m	MPC · JPL
652396	2013 YD_{157}	—	May 14, 2015	Haleakala	Pan-STARRS 1	·	2.6 km	MPC · JPL
652397	2013 YG_{159}	—	December 25, 2013	Mount Lemmon	Mount Lemmon Survey	·	1.8 km	MPC · JPL
652398	2013 YB_{162}	—	December 27, 2013	Mount Lemmon	Mount Lemmon Survey	·	720 m	MPC · JPL
652399	2013 YQ_{162}	—	December 31, 2013	Haleakala	Pan-STARRS 1	·	2.0 km	MPC · JPL
652400	2013 YX_{166}	—	December 31, 2013	Kitt Peak	Spacewatch	·	710 m	MPC · JPL

== 652401–652500 ==
back to top

Designation			Discovery			Properties		Ref
Permanent	Provisional	Named after	Date	Site	Discoverer(s)	Category	Diam.	Ref
652401	2013 YZ_{166}	—	December 25, 2013	Mount Lemmon	Mount Lemmon Survey	·	600 m	MPC · JPL
652402	2013 YD_{167}	—	December 30, 2013	Mount Lemmon	Mount Lemmon Survey	·	1.6 km	MPC · JPL
652403	2013 YL_{167}	—	December 30, 2013	Mount Lemmon	Mount Lemmon Survey	·	2.0 km	MPC · JPL
652404	2013 YM_{167}	—	December 30, 2013	Haleakala	Pan-STARRS 1	·	2.0 km	MPC · JPL
652405	2013 YE_{168}	—	November 2, 2013	Mount Lemmon	Mount Lemmon Survey	AGN	1.1 km	MPC · JPL
652406	2014 AB_{9}	—	December 14, 2013	Mount Lemmon	Mount Lemmon Survey	·	2.6 km	MPC · JPL
652407	2014 AQ_{9}	—	December 14, 2001	Kitt Peak	Spacewatch	MAR	870 m	MPC · JPL
652408	2014 AR_{10}	—	January 1, 2014	Mount Lemmon	Mount Lemmon Survey	·	1.8 km	MPC · JPL
652409	2014 AY_{11}	—	January 12, 2010	Kitt Peak	Spacewatch	(5)	1.3 km	MPC · JPL
652410 Janmarszałek	2014 AZ_{11}	Janmarszałek	December 5, 2013	Tincana	M. Kusiak, M. Żołnowsk	PHO	880 m	MPC · JPL
652411	2014 AQ_{12}	—	October 5, 1996	Kitt Peak	Spacewatch	(5)	1.0 km	MPC · JPL
652412	2014 AJ_{15}	—	October 16, 2007	Mount Lemmon	Mount Lemmon Survey	·	2.1 km	MPC · JPL
652413	2014 AH_{17}	—	March 10, 2011	Mount Lemmon	Mount Lemmon Survey	PHO	790 m	MPC · JPL
652414	2014 AS_{17}	—	January 1, 2014	Mount Lemmon	Mount Lemmon Survey	EOS	1.7 km	MPC · JPL
652415	2014 AL_{21}	—	January 3, 2014	Kitt Peak	Spacewatch	·	1.8 km	MPC · JPL
652416	2014 AU_{25}	—	April 8, 2002	Kitt Peak	Spacewatch	·	2.0 km	MPC · JPL
652417	2014 AA_{26}	—	January 3, 2014	Kitt Peak	Spacewatch	·	730 m	MPC · JPL
652418	2014 AD_{27}	—	October 4, 2004	Kitt Peak	Spacewatch	(5)	1.0 km	MPC · JPL
652419	2014 AF_{30}	—	January 3, 2014	Mount Lemmon	Mount Lemmon Survey	·	3.4 km	MPC · JPL
652420	2014 AT_{36}	—	November 7, 2002	Kitt Peak	Deep Ecliptic Survey	NYS	980 m	MPC · JPL
652421	2014 AR_{38}	—	December 11, 2013	Haleakala	Pan-STARRS 1	KOR	1.1 km	MPC · JPL
652422	2014 AT_{39}	—	October 9, 2007	Kitt Peak	Spacewatch	·	1.6 km	MPC · JPL
652423	2014 AY_{40}	—	January 5, 2014	Haleakala	Pan-STARRS 1	·	2.7 km	MPC · JPL
652424	2014 AL_{43}	—	September 20, 2003	Kitt Peak	Spacewatch	·	2.1 km	MPC · JPL
652425	2014 AX_{43}	—	March 16, 2007	Kitt Peak	Spacewatch	NYS	870 m	MPC · JPL
652426	2014 AR_{44}	—	October 24, 2005	Mauna Kea	A. Boattini	·	1.2 km	MPC · JPL
652427	2014 AJ_{45}	—	December 30, 2013	Oukaïmeden	M. Ory	EOS	1.6 km	MPC · JPL
652428	2014 AZ_{50}	—	January 10, 2014	Mount Lemmon	Mount Lemmon Survey	TIR	2.2 km	MPC · JPL
652429	2014 AE_{52}	—	December 3, 2007	Kitt Peak	Spacewatch	·	3.1 km	MPC · JPL
652430	2014 AU_{52}	—	January 11, 2014	Mount Lemmon	Mount Lemmon Survey	·	2.7 km	MPC · JPL
652431	2014 AZ_{54}	—	December 24, 2013	Mount Lemmon	Mount Lemmon Survey	·	440 m	MPC · JPL
652432	2014 AT_{57}	—	January 19, 2004	Kitt Peak	Spacewatch	·	490 m	MPC · JPL
652433	2014 AY_{57}	—	March 3, 2009	Mount Lemmon	Mount Lemmon Survey	·	2.1 km	MPC · JPL
652434	2014 AZ_{57}	—	January 20, 2009	Mount Lemmon	Mount Lemmon Survey	·	1.7 km	MPC · JPL
652435	2014 AG_{59}	—	December 5, 2007	Kitt Peak	Spacewatch	VER	2.4 km	MPC · JPL
652436	2014 AX_{60}	—	January 9, 2007	Kitt Peak	Spacewatch	·	710 m	MPC · JPL
652437	2014 AY_{60}	—	February 10, 2007	Mount Lemmon	Mount Lemmon Survey	·	530 m	MPC · JPL
652438	2014 AZ_{60}	—	October 13, 2006	Kitt Peak	Spacewatch	·	530 m	MPC · JPL
652439	2014 AO_{63}	—	January 10, 2014	Kitt Peak	Spacewatch	·	1.3 km	MPC · JPL
652440	2014 AN_{67}	—	December 22, 2003	Kitt Peak	Spacewatch	·	590 m	MPC · JPL
652441	2014 AE_{68}	—	December 1, 2006	Mount Lemmon	Mount Lemmon Survey	·	640 m	MPC · JPL
652442	2014 AZ_{68}	—	January 1, 2014	Haleakala	Pan-STARRS 1	EOS	1.5 km	MPC · JPL
652443	2014 AB_{74}	—	January 10, 2014	Kitt Peak	Spacewatch	·	2.3 km	MPC · JPL
652444	2014 AC_{74}	—	January 1, 2014	Haleakala	Pan-STARRS 1	·	1.8 km	MPC · JPL
652445	2014 AF_{77}	—	January 10, 2014	Mount Lemmon	Mount Lemmon Survey	·	670 m	MPC · JPL
652446	2014 AV_{77}	—	December 28, 2013	Kitt Peak	Spacewatch	·	2.1 km	MPC · JPL
652447	2014 AH_{78}	—	January 3, 2014	Mount Lemmon	Mount Lemmon Survey	·	1.5 km	MPC · JPL
652448	2014 AM_{80}	—	January 9, 2014	Haleakala	Pan-STARRS 1	·	1.7 km	MPC · JPL
652449	2014 AN_{80}	—	January 10, 2014	Mount Lemmon	Mount Lemmon Survey	·	1.7 km	MPC · JPL
652450	2014 BD	—	January 18, 2014	Haleakala	Pan-STARRS 1	H	430 m	MPC · JPL
652451	2014 BV_{2}	—	December 5, 2005	Kitt Peak	Spacewatch	H	440 m	MPC · JPL
652452	2014 BW_{4}	—	October 30, 2013	Kitt Peak	Spacewatch	·	1.7 km	MPC · JPL
652453	2014 BA_{5}	—	January 21, 2014	Mount Lemmon	Mount Lemmon Survey	·	1.6 km	MPC · JPL
652454	2014 BA_{7}	—	January 21, 2014	Mount Lemmon	Mount Lemmon Survey	·	2.4 km	MPC · JPL
652455	2014 BZ_{7}	—	February 4, 2009	Mount Lemmon	Mount Lemmon Survey	·	2.0 km	MPC · JPL
652456	2014 BL_{8}	—	January 21, 2014	Haleakala	Pan-STARRS 1	H	420 m	MPC · JPL
652457	2014 BD_{10}	—	November 1, 2007	Kitt Peak	Spacewatch	·	2.7 km	MPC · JPL
652458	2014 BM_{10}	—	May 5, 2006	Kitt Peak	Spacewatch	·	1.5 km	MPC · JPL
652459	2014 BQ_{10}	—	December 22, 2008	Kitt Peak	Spacewatch	·	2.1 km	MPC · JPL
652460	2014 BY_{11}	—	February 19, 2010	Kitt Peak	Spacewatch	·	1.9 km	MPC · JPL
652461	2014 BP_{13}	—	February 21, 2007	Kitt Peak	Spacewatch	·	680 m	MPC · JPL
652462	2014 BU_{13}	—	October 31, 2005	Kitt Peak	Spacewatch	·	1.6 km	MPC · JPL
652463	2014 BS_{17}	—	January 19, 2005	Kitt Peak	Spacewatch	·	2.1 km	MPC · JPL
652464	2014 BA_{18}	—	January 21, 2014	Kitt Peak	Spacewatch	·	2.0 km	MPC · JPL
652465	2014 BD_{18}	—	September 19, 2003	Palomar	NEAT	·	2.5 km	MPC · JPL
652466	2014 BY_{18}	—	October 20, 2007	Mount Lemmon	Mount Lemmon Survey	·	1.5 km	MPC · JPL
652467	2014 BW_{20}	—	December 30, 2013	Mount Lemmon	Mount Lemmon Survey	BAP	630 m	MPC · JPL
652468	2014 BU_{22}	—	August 4, 2003	Kitt Peak	Spacewatch	·	1.5 km	MPC · JPL
652469	2014 BQ_{26}	—	June 22, 2011	Kitt Peak	Spacewatch	·	2.8 km	MPC · JPL
652470	2014 BQ_{27}	—	March 15, 2010	Mount Lemmon	Mount Lemmon Survey	·	1.5 km	MPC · JPL
652471	2014 BJ_{28}	—	December 25, 2013	Mount Lemmon	Mount Lemmon Survey	T_{j} (2.99) · 3:2	6.0 km	MPC · JPL
652472	2014 BZ_{29}	—	December 4, 2007	Mount Lemmon	Mount Lemmon Survey	EOS	1.7 km	MPC · JPL
652473	2014 BJ_{31}	—	January 23, 2014	Mount Lemmon	Mount Lemmon Survey	EOS	1.5 km	MPC · JPL
652474	2014 BZ_{33}	—	January 21, 2014	Kitt Peak	Spacewatch	·	500 m	MPC · JPL
652475	2014 BB_{36}	—	January 21, 2014	Mount Lemmon	Mount Lemmon Survey	·	2.4 km	MPC · JPL
652476	2014 BC_{36}	—	January 21, 2014	Mount Lemmon	Mount Lemmon Survey	·	1.6 km	MPC · JPL
652477	2014 BO_{36}	—	October 14, 2013	Mount Lemmon	Mount Lemmon Survey	·	1.3 km	MPC · JPL
652478	2014 BY_{37}	—	January 23, 2014	Mount Lemmon	Mount Lemmon Survey	L4	6.8 km	MPC · JPL
652479	2014 BF_{41}	—	October 7, 2004	Palomar	NEAT	JUN	1.0 km	MPC · JPL
652480	2014 BV_{42}	—	April 3, 2003	Cerro Tololo	Deep Lens Survey	·	2.9 km	MPC · JPL
652481	2014 BK_{43}	—	December 31, 2013	Oukaïmeden	M. Ory	H	480 m	MPC · JPL
652482	2014 BO_{44}	—	November 7, 2007	Catalina	CSS	·	2.1 km	MPC · JPL
652483	2014 BJ_{46}	—	September 24, 2012	Charleston	R. Holmes	·	1.7 km	MPC · JPL
652484	2014 BS_{46}	—	January 4, 2003	Kitt Peak	Spacewatch	·	2.9 km	MPC · JPL
652485	2014 BB_{49}	—	November 12, 2004	Catalina	CSS	EUN	1.4 km	MPC · JPL
652486	2014 BQ_{49}	—	December 31, 2013	Mount Lemmon	Mount Lemmon Survey	·	890 m	MPC · JPL
652487	2014 BY_{49}	—	December 21, 2006	Kitt Peak	Spacewatch	V	600 m	MPC · JPL
652488	2014 BH_{50}	—	January 24, 2014	Haleakala	Pan-STARRS 1	·	520 m	MPC · JPL
652489	2014 BV_{53}	—	December 29, 2008	Kitt Peak	Spacewatch	·	1.9 km	MPC · JPL
652490	2014 BH_{55}	—	September 24, 2012	Charleston	R. Holmes	·	2.2 km	MPC · JPL
652491	2014 BR_{56}	—	November 9, 2007	Mount Lemmon	Mount Lemmon Survey	EOS	1.4 km	MPC · JPL
652492	2014 BD_{57}	—	January 20, 2009	Mount Lemmon	Mount Lemmon Survey	·	2.2 km	MPC · JPL
652493	2014 BR_{58}	—	September 28, 2006	Catalina	CSS	EOS	2.1 km	MPC · JPL
652494	2014 BA_{59}	—	October 9, 2012	Haleakala	Pan-STARRS 1	EOS	1.4 km	MPC · JPL
652495	2014 BG_{59}	—	January 29, 2014	Mount Lemmon	Mount Lemmon Survey	H	380 m	MPC · JPL
652496	2014 BT_{59}	—	February 22, 2003	Palomar	NEAT	TIR	3.1 km	MPC · JPL
652497	2014 BT_{65}	—	January 25, 2014	Haleakala	Pan-STARRS 1	·	2.3 km	MPC · JPL
652498	2014 BY_{66}	—	October 1, 2005	Mount Lemmon	Mount Lemmon Survey	·	2.9 km	MPC · JPL
652499	2014 BE_{67}	—	September 22, 2003	Kitt Peak	Spacewatch	·	1.8 km	MPC · JPL
652500	2014 BJ_{67}	—	January 21, 2014	Mount Lemmon	Mount Lemmon Survey	·	2.8 km	MPC · JPL

== 652501–652600 ==
back to top

Designation			Discovery			Properties		Ref
Permanent	Provisional	Named after	Date	Site	Discoverer(s)	Category	Diam.	Ref
652501	2014 BV_{69}	—	October 14, 2009	Mount Lemmon	Mount Lemmon Survey	·	660 m	MPC · JPL
652502	2014 BV_{70}	—	March 21, 2015	Haleakala	Pan-STARRS 1	·	1.7 km	MPC · JPL
652503	2014 BL_{71}	—	January 25, 2014	Haleakala	Pan-STARRS 1	·	2.7 km	MPC · JPL
652504	2014 BS_{73}	—	October 14, 2016	Haleakala	Pan-STARRS 1	PHO	640 m	MPC · JPL
652505	2014 BJ_{75}	—	January 25, 2014	Haleakala	Pan-STARRS 1	·	2.2 km	MPC · JPL
652506	2014 BM_{76}	—	January 24, 2014	Haleakala	Pan-STARRS 1	·	1.6 km	MPC · JPL
652507	2014 BB_{77}	—	January 21, 2014	Kitt Peak	Spacewatch	·	1.5 km	MPC · JPL
652508	2014 BE_{77}	—	January 21, 2014	Mount Lemmon	Mount Lemmon Survey	·	1.9 km	MPC · JPL
652509 Andrewcrossley	2014 BF_{77}	Andrewcrossley	January 26, 2014	Mayhill	Falla, N.	EOS	1.3 km	MPC · JPL
652510	2014 BJ_{77}	—	October 11, 2012	Haleakala	Pan-STARRS 1	·	1.2 km	MPC · JPL
652511	2014 BP_{77}	—	January 25, 2014	Haleakala	Pan-STARRS 1	·	2.2 km	MPC · JPL
652512	2014 BB_{78}	—	February 2, 2009	Kitt Peak	Spacewatch	·	1.3 km	MPC · JPL
652513	2014 BL_{78}	—	January 28, 2014	Mount Lemmon	Mount Lemmon Survey	·	2.0 km	MPC · JPL
652514	2014 BL_{80}	—	January 31, 2014	Haleakala	Pan-STARRS 1	·	2.4 km	MPC · JPL
652515	2014 BO_{81}	—	January 20, 2014	Mount Lemmon	Mount Lemmon Survey	·	2.3 km	MPC · JPL
652516	2014 BX_{83}	—	April 24, 1998	Mauna Kea	Veillet, C.	(7605)	2.6 km	MPC · JPL
652517	2014 BB_{86}	—	January 28, 2014	Kitt Peak	Spacewatch	KOR	1.2 km	MPC · JPL
652518	2014 BD_{91}	—	January 21, 2014	Mount Lemmon	Mount Lemmon Survey	·	2.9 km	MPC · JPL
652519	2014 BJ_{92}	—	December 5, 2007	Kitt Peak	Spacewatch	·	2.0 km	MPC · JPL
652520	2014 CD_{2}	—	January 24, 2014	Haleakala	Pan-STARRS 1	·	2.7 km	MPC · JPL
652521	2014 CZ_{7}	—	January 28, 2014	Oukaïmeden	M. Ory	·	1.3 km	MPC · JPL
652522	2014 CH_{10}	—	February 28, 2009	Kitt Peak	Spacewatch	EOS	1.5 km	MPC · JPL
652523	2014 CQ_{10}	—	March 27, 2011	Mount Lemmon	Mount Lemmon Survey	·	620 m	MPC · JPL
652524	2014 CL_{11}	—	March 19, 2001	Anderson Mesa	LONEOS	·	2.5 km	MPC · JPL
652525	2014 CV_{11}	—	December 5, 2007	Kitt Peak	Spacewatch	EOS	2.0 km	MPC · JPL
652526	2014 CT_{12}	—	August 30, 2011	Haleakala	Pan-STARRS 1	ELF	3.5 km	MPC · JPL
652527	2014 CL_{15}	—	January 11, 2008	Mount Lemmon	Mount Lemmon Survey	·	2.6 km	MPC · JPL
652528	2014 CV_{16}	—	December 21, 2003	Kitt Peak	Spacewatch	·	610 m	MPC · JPL
652529	2014 CT_{18}	—	February 9, 2014	Haleakala	Pan-STARRS 1	·	930 m	MPC · JPL
652530	2014 CX_{20}	—	January 28, 2014	Catalina	CSS	·	2.3 km	MPC · JPL
652531	2014 CH_{23}	—	January 13, 2005	Kitt Peak	Spacewatch	·	1.6 km	MPC · JPL
652532	2014 CR_{23}	—	February 9, 2014	Haleakala	Pan-STARRS 1	L4	7.2 km	MPC · JPL
652533	2014 CG_{24}	—	February 10, 2014	Haleakala	Pan-STARRS 1	V	620 m	MPC · JPL
652534	2014 CE_{25}	—	February 5, 2014	Nogales	M. Schwartz, P. R. Holvorcem	·	2.1 km	MPC · JPL
652535	2014 CW_{25}	—	February 9, 2014	Haleakala	Pan-STARRS 1	·	1.9 km	MPC · JPL
652536	2014 CC_{28}	—	February 11, 2014	Mount Lemmon	Mount Lemmon Survey	BRA	1.2 km	MPC · JPL
652537	2014 CG_{31}	—	February 11, 2014	Mount Lemmon	Mount Lemmon Survey	EOS	1.5 km	MPC · JPL
652538	2014 CT_{31}	—	September 26, 2006	Kitt Peak	Spacewatch	·	2.6 km	MPC · JPL
652539	2014 CM_{32}	—	February 10, 2014	Haleakala	Pan-STARRS 1	L4	8.9 km	MPC · JPL
652540	2014 DL_{1}	—	January 22, 2002	Kitt Peak	Spacewatch	(5)	1.3 km	MPC · JPL
652541	2014 DK_{2}	—	July 2, 2011	Mount Lemmon	Mount Lemmon Survey	·	2.0 km	MPC · JPL
652542	2014 DL_{2}	—	February 2, 2003	Palomar	NEAT	·	2.8 km	MPC · JPL
652543	2014 DO_{3}	—	October 21, 2012	Haleakala	Pan-STARRS 1	·	1.5 km	MPC · JPL
652544	2014 DB_{6}	—	February 9, 2003	Haleakala	NEAT	·	2.3 km	MPC · JPL
652545	2014 DE_{6}	—	September 30, 2010	Mount Lemmon	Mount Lemmon Survey	L4	9.7 km	MPC · JPL
652546	2014 DF_{6}	—	June 10, 2012	Haleakala	Pan-STARRS 1	H	600 m	MPC · JPL
652547	2014 DM_{7}	—	April 27, 2001	Kitt Peak	Spacewatch	H	470 m	MPC · JPL
652548	2014 DD_{9}	—	February 23, 2003	Kitt Peak	Spacewatch	·	3.7 km	MPC · JPL
652549	2014 DR_{14}	—	February 20, 2014	Haleakala	Pan-STARRS 1	·	880 m	MPC · JPL
652550	2014 DY_{14}	—	June 27, 2007	Lulin	LUSS	·	1.7 km	MPC · JPL
652551	2014 DU_{19}	—	February 22, 2014	Kitt Peak	Spacewatch	·	1.7 km	MPC · JPL
652552	2014 DL_{20}	—	October 19, 2007	Mount Lemmon	Mount Lemmon Survey	·	1.4 km	MPC · JPL
652553	2014 DW_{20}	—	February 24, 2014	Palomar	Palomar Transient Factory	·	1.6 km	MPC · JPL
652554	2014 DO_{24}	—	March 16, 2005	Mount Lemmon	Mount Lemmon Survey	·	1.8 km	MPC · JPL
652555	2014 DA_{27}	—	January 28, 2003	Kitt Peak	Spacewatch	·	2.1 km	MPC · JPL
652556	2014 DM_{28}	—	January 25, 2014	Haleakala	Pan-STARRS 1	EOS	1.3 km	MPC · JPL
652557	2014 DO_{29}	—	February 10, 2014	Haleakala	Pan-STARRS 1	·	2.9 km	MPC · JPL
652558	2014 DF_{31}	—	February 6, 1997	Kitt Peak	Spacewatch	·	3.0 km	MPC · JPL
652559	2014 DO_{33}	—	February 21, 2014	Kitt Peak	Spacewatch	·	1.5 km	MPC · JPL
652560	2014 DK_{34}	—	February 22, 2014	Mount Lemmon	Mount Lemmon Survey	EOS	1.7 km	MPC · JPL
652561	2014 DY_{34}	—	April 20, 2009	Mount Lemmon	Mount Lemmon Survey	THM	1.8 km	MPC · JPL
652562	2014 DB_{36}	—	February 22, 2014	Mount Lemmon	Mount Lemmon Survey	EOS	1.8 km	MPC · JPL
652563	2014 DA_{37}	—	January 31, 2009	Kitt Peak	Spacewatch	·	1.7 km	MPC · JPL
652564	2014 DE_{37}	—	January 23, 2006	Kitt Peak	Spacewatch	·	2.0 km	MPC · JPL
652565	2014 DS_{37}	—	October 20, 2012	Mount Lemmon	Mount Lemmon Survey	·	1.4 km	MPC · JPL
652566	2014 DX_{37}	—	February 22, 2014	Mount Lemmon	Mount Lemmon Survey	·	2.5 km	MPC · JPL
652567	2014 DE_{42}	—	February 26, 2004	Kitt Peak	Deep Ecliptic Survey	·	1.6 km	MPC · JPL
652568	2014 DP_{42}	—	November 16, 2012	Charleston	R. Holmes	EOS	1.8 km	MPC · JPL
652569	2014 DU_{43}	—	February 26, 2014	Mount Lemmon	Mount Lemmon Survey	·	2.0 km	MPC · JPL
652570	2014 DD_{44}	—	November 22, 2012	Kitt Peak	Spacewatch	·	1.9 km	MPC · JPL
652571	2014 DM_{45}	—	February 28, 2009	Kitt Peak	Spacewatch	·	3.0 km	MPC · JPL
652572	2014 DV_{46}	—	April 22, 2004	Kitt Peak	Spacewatch	·	610 m	MPC · JPL
652573	2014 DR_{48}	—	April 15, 2007	Kitt Peak	Spacewatch	·	720 m	MPC · JPL
652574	2014 DA_{49}	—	February 27, 2014	Kitt Peak	Spacewatch	·	660 m	MPC · JPL
652575	2014 DW_{50}	—	February 26, 2014	Haleakala	Pan-STARRS 1	·	1.9 km	MPC · JPL
652576	2014 DW_{51}	—	August 29, 2011	Mayhill-ISON	L. Elenin	·	2.4 km	MPC · JPL
652577	2014 DD_{53}	—	February 9, 2014	Mount Lemmon	Mount Lemmon Survey	MAS	560 m	MPC · JPL
652578	2014 DQ_{53}	—	February 26, 2014	Haleakala	Pan-STARRS 1	·	650 m	MPC · JPL
652579	2014 DV_{55}	—	January 27, 2007	Mount Lemmon	Mount Lemmon Survey	·	720 m	MPC · JPL
652580	2014 DH_{56}	—	November 24, 2000	La Silla	Barbieri, C.	L4	6.9 km	MPC · JPL
652581	2014 DH_{57}	—	February 26, 2014	Haleakala	Pan-STARRS 1	·	2.2 km	MPC · JPL
652582	2014 DP_{58}	—	February 26, 2014	Haleakala	Pan-STARRS 1	PHO	650 m	MPC · JPL
652583	2014 DL_{59}	—	October 28, 2005	Catalina	CSS	·	870 m	MPC · JPL
652584	2014 DK_{61}	—	March 11, 2007	Mount Lemmon	Mount Lemmon Survey	·	960 m	MPC · JPL
652585	2014 DQ_{61}	—	February 26, 2014	Haleakala	Pan-STARRS 1	KOR	1.3 km	MPC · JPL
652586	2014 DL_{65}	—	February 10, 2014	Haleakala	Pan-STARRS 1	·	1.0 km	MPC · JPL
652587	2014 DB_{67}	—	February 26, 2014	Haleakala	Pan-STARRS 1	L4	7.4 km	MPC · JPL
652588	2014 DC_{68}	—	February 26, 2014	Haleakala	Pan-STARRS 1	·	570 m	MPC · JPL
652589	2014 DF_{68}	—	February 26, 2014	Haleakala	Pan-STARRS 1	TEL	1.2 km	MPC · JPL
652590	2014 DL_{68}	—	October 24, 2009	Kitt Peak	Spacewatch	L4	7.8 km	MPC · JPL
652591	2014 DG_{69}	—	December 2, 2008	Catalina	CSS	·	1.5 km	MPC · JPL
652592	2014 DN_{69}	—	February 26, 2014	Haleakala	Pan-STARRS 1	·	1.7 km	MPC · JPL
652593	2014 DO_{69}	—	May 24, 2007	Mount Lemmon	Mount Lemmon Survey	·	1.0 km	MPC · JPL
652594	2014 DM_{71}	—	October 7, 2008	Mount Lemmon	Mount Lemmon Survey	L4	7.6 km	MPC · JPL
652595	2014 DN_{71}	—	September 23, 2011	Haleakala	Pan-STARRS 1	·	2.0 km	MPC · JPL
652596	2014 DU_{71}	—	October 4, 2006	Mount Lemmon	Mount Lemmon Survey	·	2.9 km	MPC · JPL
652597	2014 DZ_{72}	—	October 2, 2006	Mount Lemmon	Mount Lemmon Survey	EOS	1.7 km	MPC · JPL
652598	2014 DK_{73}	—	February 26, 2014	Haleakala	Pan-STARRS 1	·	980 m	MPC · JPL
652599	2014 DM_{73}	—	January 2, 2012	Kitt Peak	Spacewatch	L4	7.2 km	MPC · JPL
652600	2014 DH_{74}	—	February 2, 2009	Mount Lemmon	Mount Lemmon Survey	·	1.8 km	MPC · JPL

== 652601–652700 ==
back to top

Designation			Discovery			Properties		Ref
Permanent	Provisional	Named after	Date	Site	Discoverer(s)	Category	Diam.	Ref
652601	2014 DB_{75}	—	May 29, 2000	Kitt Peak	Spacewatch	·	920 m	MPC · JPL
652602	2014 DO_{75}	—	February 26, 2014	Haleakala	Pan-STARRS 1	ERI	1.5 km	MPC · JPL
652603	2014 DU_{75}	—	February 26, 2014	Haleakala	Pan-STARRS 1	·	570 m	MPC · JPL
652604	2014 DX_{77}	—	April 20, 2009	Mount Lemmon	Mount Lemmon Survey	·	1.8 km	MPC · JPL
652605	2014 DH_{78}	—	July 28, 2005	Palomar	NEAT	·	3.4 km	MPC · JPL
652606	2014 DQ_{81}	—	September 29, 2005	Mount Lemmon	Mount Lemmon Survey	·	800 m	MPC · JPL
652607	2014 DG_{86}	—	February 26, 2014	Mount Lemmon	Mount Lemmon Survey	·	610 m	MPC · JPL
652608	2014 DO_{91}	—	February 26, 2014	Mount Lemmon	Mount Lemmon Survey	·	2.5 km	MPC · JPL
652609	2014 DA_{95}	—	November 16, 2006	Kitt Peak	Spacewatch	·	2.1 km	MPC · JPL
652610	2014 DO_{95}	—	September 20, 2011	Haleakala	Pan-STARRS 1	·	1.6 km	MPC · JPL
652611	2014 DZ_{96}	—	January 3, 2013	Oukaïmeden	C. Rinner	·	1.5 km	MPC · JPL
652612	2014 DS_{99}	—	January 25, 2014	Haleakala	Pan-STARRS 1	EOS	1.5 km	MPC · JPL
652613	2014 DC_{100}	—	January 24, 2007	Kitt Peak	Spacewatch	PHO	780 m	MPC · JPL
652614	2014 DD_{100}	—	October 28, 2008	Kitt Peak	Spacewatch	·	1.2 km	MPC · JPL
652615	2014 DH_{101}	—	October 22, 2012	Haleakala	Pan-STARRS 1	·	1.5 km	MPC · JPL
652616	2014 DG_{104}	—	February 27, 2014	Mount Lemmon	Mount Lemmon Survey	EUN	1.2 km	MPC · JPL
652617	2014 DO_{105}	—	February 9, 2014	Haleakala	Pan-STARRS 1	·	520 m	MPC · JPL
652618	2014 DM_{106}	—	February 21, 2003	Palomar	NEAT	·	2.8 km	MPC · JPL
652619	2014 DG_{110}	—	February 27, 2014	Haleakala	Pan-STARRS 1	·	2.0 km	MPC · JPL
652620	2014 DM_{111}	—	January 16, 2005	Mauna Kea	Veillet, C.	·	1.4 km	MPC · JPL
652621	2014 DJ_{118}	—	February 27, 2014	Kitt Peak	Spacewatch	·	690 m	MPC · JPL
652622	2014 DU_{118}	—	January 9, 2014	Mount Lemmon	Mount Lemmon Survey	·	2.6 km	MPC · JPL
652623	2014 DY_{118}	—	March 15, 2007	Kitt Peak	Spacewatch	MAS	690 m	MPC · JPL
652624	2014 DY_{122}	—	February 26, 2007	Mount Lemmon	Mount Lemmon Survey	·	670 m	MPC · JPL
652625	2014 DV_{123}	—	March 15, 2007	Kitt Peak	Spacewatch	MAS	560 m	MPC · JPL
652626	2014 DU_{125}	—	September 8, 2000	Kitt Peak	Spacewatch	·	2.4 km	MPC · JPL
652627	2014 DY_{125}	—	February 20, 2014	Mount Lemmon	Mount Lemmon Survey	·	700 m	MPC · JPL
652628	2014 DU_{126}	—	February 28, 2014	Haleakala	Pan-STARRS 1	·	1.5 km	MPC · JPL
652629	2014 DV_{126}	—	March 26, 2007	Mount Lemmon	Mount Lemmon Survey	·	1.0 km	MPC · JPL
652630	2014 DA_{127}	—	October 19, 2012	Haleakala	Pan-STARRS 1	·	1.2 km	MPC · JPL
652631	2014 DF_{127}	—	February 28, 2014	Haleakala	Pan-STARRS 1	·	2.4 km	MPC · JPL
652632	2014 DN_{129}	—	November 12, 2012	Mount Lemmon	Mount Lemmon Survey	·	1.6 km	MPC · JPL
652633	2014 DS_{129}	—	February 28, 2014	Haleakala	Pan-STARRS 1	KOR	1.1 km	MPC · JPL
652634	2014 DP_{133}	—	November 14, 2012	Mount Lemmon	Mount Lemmon Survey	·	2.2 km	MPC · JPL
652635	2014 DB_{135}	—	October 14, 2012	Catalina	CSS	V	660 m	MPC · JPL
652636	2014 DN_{135}	—	October 29, 2005	Kitt Peak	Spacewatch	·	720 m	MPC · JPL
652637	2014 DB_{136}	—	February 28, 2014	Haleakala	Pan-STARRS 1	·	580 m	MPC · JPL
652638	2014 DK_{136}	—	May 23, 2001	Cerro Tololo	Deep Ecliptic Survey	·	2.0 km	MPC · JPL
652639	2014 DW_{136}	—	February 28, 2014	Haleakala	Pan-STARRS 1	L4	6.5 km	MPC · JPL
652640	2014 DB_{138}	—	February 26, 2014	Mount Lemmon	Mount Lemmon Survey	·	530 m	MPC · JPL
652641	2014 DJ_{138}	—	March 12, 2004	Palomar	NEAT	·	1.8 km	MPC · JPL
652642	2014 DA_{139}	—	February 28, 2014	Haleakala	Pan-STARRS 1	·	2.4 km	MPC · JPL
652643	2014 DZ_{141}	—	December 11, 2009	Mount Lemmon	Mount Lemmon Survey	ERI	1.4 km	MPC · JPL
652644	2014 DX_{143}	—	September 2, 2008	Kitt Peak	Spacewatch	L4	5.4 km	MPC · JPL
652645	2014 DB_{145}	—	March 28, 2009	Mount Lemmon	Mount Lemmon Survey	·	1.6 km	MPC · JPL
652646	2014 DD_{147}	—	November 5, 2007	Catalina	CSS	·	2.5 km	MPC · JPL
652647	2014 DM_{147}	—	September 3, 2008	Kitt Peak	Spacewatch	·	880 m	MPC · JPL
652648	2014 DQ_{147}	—	January 12, 2008	Mount Lemmon	Mount Lemmon Survey	·	2.8 km	MPC · JPL
652649	2014 DY_{147}	—	February 27, 2014	Mount Lemmon	Mount Lemmon Survey	·	2.4 km	MPC · JPL
652650	2014 DL_{148}	—	September 17, 2012	Kitt Peak	Spacewatch	·	1.2 km	MPC · JPL
652651	2014 DT_{148}	—	February 28, 2014	Haleakala	Pan-STARRS 1	·	1.3 km	MPC · JPL
652652	2014 DP_{149}	—	September 30, 2003	Kitt Peak	Spacewatch	MAR	760 m	MPC · JPL
652653	2014 DZ_{152}	—	February 28, 2014	Haleakala	Pan-STARRS 1	·	2.9 km	MPC · JPL
652654	2014 DD_{154}	—	October 20, 2012	Kitt Peak	Spacewatch	·	1.0 km	MPC · JPL
652655	2014 DH_{155}	—	February 26, 2014	Haleakala	Pan-STARRS 1	·	670 m	MPC · JPL
652656	2014 DN_{158}	—	February 28, 2014	Haleakala	Pan-STARRS 1	URS	2.1 km	MPC · JPL
652657	2014 DF_{159}	—	February 24, 2014	Haleakala	Pan-STARRS 1	EOS	1.6 km	MPC · JPL
652658	2014 DK_{159}	—	January 18, 2008	Kitt Peak	Spacewatch	·	1.8 km	MPC · JPL
652659	2014 DS_{160}	—	February 24, 2014	Haleakala	Pan-STARRS 1	·	570 m	MPC · JPL
652660	2014 DV_{163}	—	February 27, 2014	Mount Lemmon	Mount Lemmon Survey	·	2.0 km	MPC · JPL
652661	2014 DY_{163}	—	February 26, 2014	Haleakala	Pan-STARRS 1	·	1.4 km	MPC · JPL
652662	2014 DR_{166}	—	February 28, 2014	Haleakala	Pan-STARRS 1	·	1.9 km	MPC · JPL
652663	2014 DU_{167}	—	February 28, 2014	Haleakala	Pan-STARRS 1	·	1.7 km	MPC · JPL
652664	2014 DQ_{168}	—	February 27, 2014	Kitt Peak	Spacewatch	·	2.9 km	MPC · JPL
652665	2014 DV_{168}	—	February 27, 2014	Haleakala	Pan-STARRS 1	·	2.1 km	MPC · JPL
652666	2014 DD_{169}	—	February 26, 2014	Haleakala	Pan-STARRS 1	·	2.5 km	MPC · JPL
652667	2014 DF_{169}	—	February 26, 2014	Haleakala	Pan-STARRS 1	THM	1.8 km	MPC · JPL
652668	2014 DN_{169}	—	February 24, 2014	Haleakala	Pan-STARRS 1	EOS	1.4 km	MPC · JPL
652669	2014 DC_{170}	—	February 26, 2014	Haleakala	Pan-STARRS 1	·	2.2 km	MPC · JPL
652670	2014 DP_{174}	—	February 25, 2014	Haleakala	Pan-STARRS 1	·	710 m	MPC · JPL
652671	2014 DR_{174}	—	February 22, 2014	Kitt Peak	Spacewatch	·	2.5 km	MPC · JPL
652672	2014 DT_{174}	—	February 28, 2014	Haleakala	Pan-STARRS 1	·	860 m	MPC · JPL
652673	2014 DL_{180}	—	February 28, 2014	Haleakala	Pan-STARRS 1	·	2.2 km	MPC · JPL
652674	2014 DF_{181}	—	April 7, 2002	Cerro Tololo	Deep Ecliptic Survey	L4	6.5 km	MPC · JPL
652675	2014 DJ_{181}	—	February 26, 2014	Haleakala	Pan-STARRS 1	L4	6.2 km	MPC · JPL
652676	2014 DH_{182}	—	February 26, 2014	Haleakala	Pan-STARRS 1	·	580 m	MPC · JPL
652677	2014 DY_{186}	—	February 28, 2014	Haleakala	Pan-STARRS 1	·	830 m	MPC · JPL
652678	2014 DA_{190}	—	February 26, 2014	Mount Lemmon	Mount Lemmon Survey	L4	6.8 km	MPC · JPL
652679	2014 DD_{197}	—	February 28, 2014	Haleakala	Pan-STARRS 1	·	1.9 km	MPC · JPL
652680	2014 DK_{197}	—	February 24, 2014	Haleakala	Pan-STARRS 1	·	2.3 km	MPC · JPL
652681	2014 DK_{200}	—	February 28, 2014	Mount Lemmon	Mount Lemmon Survey	·	2.8 km	MPC · JPL
652682	2014 DA_{201}	—	September 25, 2006	Mount Lemmon	Mount Lemmon Survey	·	2.0 km	MPC · JPL
652683	2014 EE_{3}	—	September 5, 2008	Kitt Peak	Spacewatch	L4	8.2 km	MPC · JPL
652684	2014 EW_{5}	—	February 19, 2009	Kitt Peak	Spacewatch	KOR	1.5 km	MPC · JPL
652685	2014 EY_{9}	—	February 25, 2014	Kitt Peak	Spacewatch	·	1.5 km	MPC · JPL
652686	2014 EX_{12}	—	June 23, 2007	Kitt Peak	Spacewatch	·	1.3 km	MPC · JPL
652687	2014 EX_{18}	—	February 9, 2014	Haleakala	Pan-STARRS 1	L4	8.1 km	MPC · JPL
652688	2014 EK_{19}	—	September 24, 2011	Haleakala	Pan-STARRS 1	VER	2.2 km	MPC · JPL
652689	2014 EO_{19}	—	September 30, 2011	Kitt Peak	Spacewatch	·	1.7 km	MPC · JPL
652690	2014 EX_{21}	—	October 3, 2011	Mount Lemmon	Mount Lemmon Survey	·	2.5 km	MPC · JPL
652691	2014 EL_{22}	—	February 9, 2014	Kitt Peak	Spacewatch	HYG	2.1 km	MPC · JPL
652692	2014 EX_{23}	—	February 27, 2014	Mount Lemmon	Mount Lemmon Survey	·	610 m	MPC · JPL
652693	2014 ED_{24}	—	March 25, 2007	Mount Lemmon	Mount Lemmon Survey	PHO	680 m	MPC · JPL
652694	2014 EM_{24}	—	March 9, 2014	Haleakala	Pan-STARRS 1	H	570 m	MPC · JPL
652695	2014 EJ_{26}	—	February 28, 2014	Haleakala	Pan-STARRS 1	·	2.4 km	MPC · JPL
652696	2014 EU_{28}	—	February 25, 2014	Kitt Peak	Spacewatch	·	2.4 km	MPC · JPL
652697	2014 ED_{31}	—	March 7, 2014	Kitt Peak	Spacewatch	·	2.0 km	MPC · JPL
652698	2014 ET_{32}	—	March 8, 2014	Kitt Peak	Spacewatch	·	2.1 km	MPC · JPL
652699	2014 ED_{33}	—	March 8, 2014	Mount Lemmon	Mount Lemmon Survey	ELF	3.8 km	MPC · JPL
652700	2014 EN_{34}	—	February 27, 2014	Haleakala	Pan-STARRS 1	·	2.3 km	MPC · JPL

== 652701–652800 ==
back to top

Designation			Discovery			Properties		Ref
Permanent	Provisional	Named after	Date	Site	Discoverer(s)	Category	Diam.	Ref
652701	2014 EF_{37}	—	March 8, 2014	Mount Lemmon	Mount Lemmon Survey	EOS	1.4 km	MPC · JPL
652702	2014 ET_{37}	—	September 23, 2009	Mount Lemmon	Mount Lemmon Survey	L4	10 km	MPC · JPL
652703	2014 EV_{37}	—	December 18, 2009	Mount Lemmon	Mount Lemmon Survey	·	990 m	MPC · JPL
652704	2014 ED_{38}	—	October 8, 2007	Mount Lemmon	Mount Lemmon Survey	·	2.5 km	MPC · JPL
652705	2014 EX_{38}	—	November 1, 2006	Mount Lemmon	Mount Lemmon Survey	·	2.2 km	MPC · JPL
652706	2014 ER_{39}	—	April 2, 2009	Mount Lemmon	Mount Lemmon Survey	EOS	1.8 km	MPC · JPL
652707	2014 EJ_{40}	—	February 26, 2014	Haleakala	Pan-STARRS 1	EOS	2.0 km	MPC · JPL
652708	2014 ER_{40}	—	January 7, 2010	Kitt Peak	Spacewatch	·	1.4 km	MPC · JPL
652709	2014 EZ_{40}	—	March 8, 2014	Mount Lemmon	Mount Lemmon Survey	·	1.7 km	MPC · JPL
652710	2014 EN_{41}	—	April 5, 2011	Mount Lemmon	Mount Lemmon Survey	·	690 m	MPC · JPL
652711	2014 EZ_{43}	—	December 19, 2007	Mount Lemmon	Mount Lemmon Survey	·	2.2 km	MPC · JPL
652712	2014 EH_{44}	—	March 10, 2014	Kitt Peak	Spacewatch	·	2.0 km	MPC · JPL
652713	2014 ED_{45}	—	February 13, 2008	Catalina	CSS	·	2.7 km	MPC · JPL
652714	2014 EJ_{47}	—	February 26, 2014	Mount Lemmon	Mount Lemmon Survey	·	2.7 km	MPC · JPL
652715	2014 EA_{51}	—	March 10, 2014	Mount Lemmon	Mount Lemmon Survey	·	2.7 km	MPC · JPL
652716	2014 EJ_{52}	—	March 6, 2014	Mount Lemmon	Mount Lemmon Survey	·	760 m	MPC · JPL
652717	2014 EM_{53}	—	October 28, 2017	Mount Lemmon	Mount Lemmon Survey	EOS	1.3 km	MPC · JPL
652718	2014 EU_{54}	—	May 21, 2015	Haleakala	Pan-STARRS 1	·	2.0 km	MPC · JPL
652719	2014 EA_{61}	—	May 14, 2015	Haleakala	Pan-STARRS 1	ARM	2.3 km	MPC · JPL
652720	2014 EM_{63}	—	July 16, 2004	Socorro	LINEAR	·	1.2 km	MPC · JPL
652721	2014 EM_{66}	—	January 28, 2015	Haleakala	Pan-STARRS 1	L4	7.3 km	MPC · JPL
652722	2014 EQ_{66}	—	September 23, 2008	Kitt Peak	Spacewatch	·	970 m	MPC · JPL
652723	2014 ER_{66}	—	January 30, 2008	Kitt Peak	Spacewatch	·	2.3 km	MPC · JPL
652724	2014 ET_{66}	—	November 6, 2012	Kitt Peak	Spacewatch	EOS	1.4 km	MPC · JPL
652725	2014 EC_{68}	—	January 17, 2013	Haleakala	Pan-STARRS 1	L4	5.4 km	MPC · JPL
652726	2014 EB_{69}	—	February 28, 2014	Haleakala	Pan-STARRS 1	·	2.1 km	MPC · JPL
652727	2014 EF_{72}	—	February 28, 2014	Haleakala	Pan-STARRS 1	NYS	840 m	MPC · JPL
652728	2014 EO_{72}	—	September 27, 2006	Kitt Peak	Spacewatch	·	1.9 km	MPC · JPL
652729	2014 EW_{74}	—	October 18, 2012	Mount Lemmon	Mount Lemmon Survey	·	1.5 km	MPC · JPL
652730	2014 EB_{75}	—	October 22, 2012	Haleakala	Pan-STARRS 1	·	2.4 km	MPC · JPL
652731	2014 EA_{79}	—	February 9, 2008	Mount Lemmon	Mount Lemmon Survey	VER	2.2 km	MPC · JPL
652732	2014 EL_{85}	—	September 2, 2017	Haleakala	Pan-STARRS 1	·	2.0 km	MPC · JPL
652733	2014 ER_{88}	—	October 12, 2017	Mount Lemmon	Mount Lemmon Survey	EOS	1.2 km	MPC · JPL
652734	2014 EQ_{91}	—	December 31, 2008	Kitt Peak	Spacewatch	·	1.5 km	MPC · JPL
652735	2014 EZ_{93}	—	October 27, 2017	Mount Lemmon	Mount Lemmon Survey	·	1.8 km	MPC · JPL
652736	2014 EG_{95}	—	August 29, 2005	Kitt Peak	Spacewatch	·	1.6 km	MPC · JPL
652737	2014 EA_{96}	—	September 4, 2011	Haleakala	Pan-STARRS 1	EOS	1.4 km	MPC · JPL
652738	2014 ED_{98}	—	May 26, 2015	Haleakala	Pan-STARRS 1	·	2.2 km	MPC · JPL
652739	2014 EW_{99}	—	September 20, 2011	Catalina	CSS	·	2.3 km	MPC · JPL
652740	2014 EP_{102}	—	April 18, 2009	Kitt Peak	Spacewatch	·	2.7 km	MPC · JPL
652741	2014 EV_{102}	—	November 12, 2010	Mount Lemmon	Mount Lemmon Survey	L4	6.0 km	MPC · JPL
652742	2014 EA_{107}	—	September 14, 2005	Kitt Peak	Spacewatch	·	730 m	MPC · JPL
652743	2014 EC_{107}	—	October 22, 2017	Kitt Peak	Spacewatch	·	2.5 km	MPC · JPL
652744	2014 EO_{107}	—	September 18, 2001	Kitt Peak	Spacewatch	·	2.0 km	MPC · JPL
652745	2014 EH_{108}	—	February 28, 2014	Haleakala	Pan-STARRS 1	·	2.3 km	MPC · JPL
652746	2014 EQ_{111}	—	September 19, 2017	Haleakala	Pan-STARRS 1	EOS	1.3 km	MPC · JPL
652747	2014 EL_{114}	—	November 13, 2010	Kitt Peak	Spacewatch	L4	6.7 km	MPC · JPL
652748	2014 EW_{116}	—	December 11, 2012	Mount Lemmon	Mount Lemmon Survey	·	1.6 km	MPC · JPL
652749	2014 ES_{117}	—	October 13, 2006	Kitt Peak	Spacewatch	·	2.4 km	MPC · JPL
652750	2014 EL_{118}	—	April 18, 2015	Cerro Tololo-DECam	DECam	L4	6.3 km	MPC · JPL
652751	2014 EV_{120}	—	August 25, 2000	Cerro Tololo	Deep Ecliptic Survey	EOS	1.4 km	MPC · JPL
652752	2014 EN_{122}	—	January 16, 2008	Kitt Peak	Spacewatch	·	2.6 km	MPC · JPL
652753	2014 EX_{122}	—	October 17, 2001	Socorro	LINEAR	·	1.9 km	MPC · JPL
652754	2014 EB_{124}	—	September 26, 2011	Mount Lemmon	Mount Lemmon Survey	·	1.3 km	MPC · JPL
652755	2014 EG_{130}	—	November 11, 2012	Catalina	CSS	·	1.7 km	MPC · JPL
652756	2014 EQ_{133}	—	May 21, 2015	Cerro Tololo	DECam	·	2.4 km	MPC · JPL
652757	2014 EZ_{137}	—	September 2, 2011	Haleakala	Pan-STARRS 1	·	2.0 km	MPC · JPL
652758	2014 EN_{140}	—	September 15, 2012	Nogales	M. Schwartz, P. R. Holvorcem	·	2.3 km	MPC · JPL
652759	2014 ER_{141}	—	January 10, 2007	Mount Lemmon	Mount Lemmon Survey	·	560 m	MPC · JPL
652760	2014 EH_{147}	—	September 24, 2008	Kitt Peak	Spacewatch	·	530 m	MPC · JPL
652761	2014 EV_{147}	—	September 17, 2009	Kitt Peak	Spacewatch	L4	6.8 km	MPC · JPL
652762	2014 EQ_{149}	—	February 21, 2014	Mayhill-ISON	L. Elenin	·	640 m	MPC · JPL
652763	2014 EL_{155}	—	January 10, 2013	Haleakala	Pan-STARRS 1	L4	7.4 km	MPC · JPL
652764	2014 EJ_{156}	—	September 2, 2008	Kitt Peak	Spacewatch	·	990 m	MPC · JPL
652765	2014 ES_{156}	—	December 13, 2012	Mount Lemmon	Mount Lemmon Survey	·	2.2 km	MPC · JPL
652766	2014 EX_{156}	—	February 28, 2014	Haleakala	Pan-STARRS 1	L4	6.5 km	MPC · JPL
652767	2014 EL_{158}	—	April 18, 2015	Cerro Tololo-DECam	DECam	L4	5.5 km	MPC · JPL
652768	2014 EF_{160}	—	October 15, 2017	Mount Lemmon	Mount Lemmon Survey	·	2.2 km	MPC · JPL
652769	2014 EA_{163}	—	May 20, 2015	Cerro Tololo	DECam	·	2.0 km	MPC · JPL
652770	2014 EN_{164}	—	September 21, 2017	Haleakala	Pan-STARRS 1	EOS	1.5 km	MPC · JPL
652771	2014 EY_{169}	—	August 28, 2016	Mount Lemmon	Mount Lemmon Survey	EOS	1.7 km	MPC · JPL
652772	2014 EY_{170}	—	November 25, 2012	Kitt Peak	Spacewatch	·	1.4 km	MPC · JPL
652773	2014 EA_{172}	—	October 1, 2011	Kitt Peak	Spacewatch	·	2.3 km	MPC · JPL
652774	2014 EC_{172}	—	September 6, 2011	Haleakala	Pan-STARRS 1	VER	1.8 km	MPC · JPL
652775	2014 EQ_{175}	—	November 3, 2007	Kitt Peak	Spacewatch	·	2.2 km	MPC · JPL
652776	2014 EE_{177}	—	July 27, 2011	Haleakala	Pan-STARRS 1	·	2.2 km	MPC · JPL
652777	2014 ES_{177}	—	January 11, 2008	Kitt Peak	Spacewatch	·	2.1 km	MPC · JPL
652778	2014 EZ_{180}	—	November 7, 2010	Mount Lemmon	Mount Lemmon Survey	L4	6.2 km	MPC · JPL
652779	2014 EZ_{181}	—	August 29, 2006	Kitt Peak	Spacewatch	·	1.4 km	MPC · JPL
652780	2014 EG_{182}	—	December 1, 2005	Kitt Peak	Spacewatch	NYS	990 m	MPC · JPL
652781	2014 EY_{183}	—	November 22, 2012	Kitt Peak	Spacewatch	·	1.9 km	MPC · JPL
652782	2014 EK_{184}	—	September 24, 2017	Haleakala	Pan-STARRS 1	·	1.3 km	MPC · JPL
652783	2014 EU_{192}	—	March 4, 2014	Cerro Tololo	DECam	·	2.2 km	MPC · JPL
652784	2014 EY_{192}	—	July 11, 2016	Haleakala	Pan-STARRS 1	VER	2.0 km	MPC · JPL
652785	2014 EE_{195}	—	September 2, 2011	Haleakala	Pan-STARRS 1	·	2.4 km	MPC · JPL
652786	2014 EN_{195}	—	June 7, 2016	Haleakala	Pan-STARRS 1	·	1.5 km	MPC · JPL
652787	2014 EB_{198}	—	August 13, 2016	Haleakala	Pan-STARRS 1	EOS	1.2 km	MPC · JPL
652788	2014 EG_{198}	—	July 25, 2015	Haleakala	Pan-STARRS 1	·	890 m	MPC · JPL
652789	2014 EA_{204}	—	February 26, 2014	Haleakala	Pan-STARRS 1	·	950 m	MPC · JPL
652790	2014 EB_{204}	—	February 8, 2008	Mount Lemmon	Mount Lemmon Survey	·	2.3 km	MPC · JPL
652791	2014 EY_{204}	—	May 11, 2015	Mount Lemmon	Mount Lemmon Survey	·	2.4 km	MPC · JPL
652792	2014 EG_{208}	—	September 26, 2011	Haleakala	Pan-STARRS 1	·	2.2 km	MPC · JPL
652793	2014 EL_{208}	—	October 17, 2012	Haleakala	Pan-STARRS 1	HNS	1.4 km	MPC · JPL
652794	2014 EA_{209}	—	May 14, 2015	Haleakala	Pan-STARRS 1	·	2.3 km	MPC · JPL
652795	2014 EY_{209}	—	October 21, 2012	Kitt Peak	Spacewatch	MRX	820 m	MPC · JPL
652796	2014 EW_{211}	—	October 29, 2017	Haleakala	Pan-STARRS 1	·	1.7 km	MPC · JPL
652797	2014 EJ_{219}	—	July 27, 2017	Haleakala	Pan-STARRS 1	·	2.2 km	MPC · JPL
652798	2014 EH_{222}	—	March 5, 2014	Cerro Tololo	DECam	L4	5.3 km	MPC · JPL
652799	2014 EK_{222}	—	January 14, 2008	Kitt Peak	Spacewatch	·	2.6 km	MPC · JPL
652800	2014 EL_{226}	—	September 15, 2007	Mount Lemmon	Mount Lemmon Survey	·	1.7 km	MPC · JPL

== 652801–652900 ==
back to top

Designation			Discovery			Properties		Ref
Permanent	Provisional	Named after	Date	Site	Discoverer(s)	Category	Diam.	Ref
652801	2014 EW_{230}	—	August 28, 2016	Mount Lemmon	Mount Lemmon Survey	·	2.0 km	MPC · JPL
652802	2014 EX_{232}	—	September 16, 2006	Catalina	CSS	EOS	2.0 km	MPC · JPL
652803	2014 EC_{233}	—	June 29, 2016	Haleakala	Pan-STARRS 1	EOS	1.4 km	MPC · JPL
652804	2014 EL_{233}	—	September 26, 2017	Haleakala	Pan-STARRS 1	·	2.0 km	MPC · JPL
652805	2014 EF_{235}	—	September 4, 2011	Haleakala	Pan-STARRS 1	EOS	1.6 km	MPC · JPL
652806	2014 EC_{240}	—	August 11, 2011	Charleston	R. Holmes	·	2.3 km	MPC · JPL
652807	2014 EA_{243}	—	September 6, 2015	Haleakala	Pan-STARRS 1	·	730 m	MPC · JPL
652808	2014 EA_{245}	—	February 28, 2014	Haleakala	Pan-STARRS 1	HYG	2.1 km	MPC · JPL
652809	2014 EK_{250}	—	March 11, 2014	Mount Lemmon	Mount Lemmon Survey	·	2.0 km	MPC · JPL
652810	2014 EW_{253}	—	November 12, 2010	Mount Lemmon	Mount Lemmon Survey	L4	7.4 km	MPC · JPL
652811	2014 EK_{254}	—	March 12, 2014	Mount Lemmon	Mount Lemmon Survey	H	390 m	MPC · JPL
652812	2014 EM_{256}	—	March 11, 2014	Mount Lemmon	Mount Lemmon Survey	EOS	1.7 km	MPC · JPL
652813	2014 EJ_{257}	—	April 29, 2009	Mount Lemmon	Mount Lemmon Survey	·	2.4 km	MPC · JPL
652814	2014 FC_{1}	—	March 20, 2014	Mount Lemmon	Mount Lemmon Survey	·	540 m	MPC · JPL
652815	2014 FT_{1}	—	March 20, 2014	Mount Lemmon	Mount Lemmon Survey	EUP	2.7 km	MPC · JPL
652816	2014 FY_{1}	—	March 20, 2014	Mount Lemmon	Mount Lemmon Survey	·	2.8 km	MPC · JPL
652817	2014 FS_{2}	—	March 23, 2003	Kitt Peak	Spacewatch	PHO	830 m	MPC · JPL
652818	2014 FW_{2}	—	March 12, 2014	Mount Lemmon	Mount Lemmon Survey	L4	8.2 km	MPC · JPL
652819	2014 FE_{5}	—	October 2, 2006	Mount Lemmon	Mount Lemmon Survey	·	2.4 km	MPC · JPL
652820	2014 FX_{5}	—	February 10, 2014	Haleakala	Pan-STARRS 1	·	1.1 km	MPC · JPL
652821	2014 FV_{8}	—	August 23, 2011	Haleakala	Pan-STARRS 1	·	1.6 km	MPC · JPL
652822	2014 FZ_{8}	—	February 26, 2014	Haleakala	Pan-STARRS 1	·	2.6 km	MPC · JPL
652823	2014 FZ_{11}	—	March 20, 2014	Mount Lemmon	Mount Lemmon Survey	·	2.8 km	MPC · JPL
652824	2014 FA_{12}	—	July 3, 2005	Mount Lemmon	Mount Lemmon Survey	·	2.9 km	MPC · JPL
652825	2014 FB_{12}	—	May 4, 2005	Kitt Peak	Spacewatch	BRA	2.0 km	MPC · JPL
652826	2014 FC_{12}	—	July 16, 2004	Cerro Tololo	Deep Ecliptic Survey	PHO	800 m	MPC · JPL
652827	2014 FP_{12}	—	February 22, 2014	Kitt Peak	Spacewatch	·	2.1 km	MPC · JPL
652828	2014 FK_{13}	—	October 16, 2006	Catalina	CSS	·	2.8 km	MPC · JPL
652829	2014 FA_{14}	—	March 13, 2014	Mount Lemmon	Mount Lemmon Survey	·	2.7 km	MPC · JPL
652830	2014 FZ_{16}	—	March 22, 2014	Mount Lemmon	Mount Lemmon Survey	·	770 m	MPC · JPL
652831	2014 FM_{20}	—	February 20, 2014	Mount Lemmon	Mount Lemmon Survey	EOS	1.8 km	MPC · JPL
652832	2014 FV_{20}	—	February 26, 2014	Mount Lemmon	Mount Lemmon Survey	TEL	1.5 km	MPC · JPL
652833	2014 FA_{21}	—	February 3, 2014	Calar Alto-CASADO	Mottola, S., Hellmich, S.	·	2.4 km	MPC · JPL
652834	2014 FP_{21}	—	January 3, 2009	Mount Lemmon	Mount Lemmon Survey	·	2.0 km	MPC · JPL
652835	2014 FS_{24}	—	January 1, 2008	Kitt Peak	Spacewatch	·	2.3 km	MPC · JPL
652836	2014 FA_{25}	—	February 28, 2014	Haleakala	Pan-STARRS 1	·	2.7 km	MPC · JPL
652837	2014 FC_{25}	—	October 22, 2006	Kitt Peak	Spacewatch	·	2.1 km	MPC · JPL
652838	2014 FY_{25}	—	March 23, 2014	Mount Lemmon	Mount Lemmon Survey	TEL	1.2 km	MPC · JPL
652839	2014 FB_{26}	—	June 17, 2005	Mount Lemmon	Mount Lemmon Survey	EOS	1.9 km	MPC · JPL
652840	2014 FH_{26}	—	March 23, 2014	Mount Lemmon	Mount Lemmon Survey	·	2.4 km	MPC · JPL
652841	2014 FR_{26}	—	November 7, 2007	Mount Lemmon	Mount Lemmon Survey	·	2.3 km	MPC · JPL
652842	2014 FT_{26}	—	February 28, 2014	Haleakala	Pan-STARRS 1	·	710 m	MPC · JPL
652843	2014 FO_{27}	—	September 28, 2008	Mount Lemmon	Mount Lemmon Survey	·	1.2 km	MPC · JPL
652844	2014 FW_{27}	—	March 23, 2014	Mount Lemmon	Mount Lemmon Survey	·	2.6 km	MPC · JPL
652845	2014 FT_{28}	—	September 2, 2011	Haleakala	Pan-STARRS 1	·	2.2 km	MPC · JPL
652846	2014 FN_{29}	—	October 7, 2004	Socorro	LINEAR	·	1.5 km	MPC · JPL
652847	2014 FV_{29}	—	March 13, 2007	Mount Lemmon	Mount Lemmon Survey	·	800 m	MPC · JPL
652848	2014 FP_{34}	—	February 27, 2014	Haleakala	Pan-STARRS 1	MAS	550 m	MPC · JPL
652849	2014 FY_{34}	—	March 22, 2014	Kitt Peak	Spacewatch	·	2.4 km	MPC · JPL
652850	2014 FD_{35}	—	March 10, 2014	Kitt Peak	Spacewatch	·	800 m	MPC · JPL
652851	2014 FC_{37}	—	August 25, 2006	Lulin	LUSS	JUN	1.2 km	MPC · JPL
652852	2014 FE_{39}	—	February 26, 2014	Haleakala	Pan-STARRS 1	·	2.0 km	MPC · JPL
652853	2014 FN_{39}	—	February 11, 2008	Mount Lemmon	Mount Lemmon Survey	·	2.2 km	MPC · JPL
652854	2014 FO_{39}	—	March 25, 2014	Kitt Peak	Spacewatch	·	1.1 km	MPC · JPL
652855	2014 FR_{40}	—	October 7, 2008	Mount Lemmon	Mount Lemmon Survey	·	1.3 km	MPC · JPL
652856	2014 FW_{43}	—	October 5, 2002	Palomar	NEAT	H	560 m	MPC · JPL
652857	2014 FS_{44}	—	May 16, 2007	Mount Lemmon	Mount Lemmon Survey	·	890 m	MPC · JPL
652858	2014 FZ_{44}	—	January 10, 2008	Mount Lemmon	Mount Lemmon Survey	·	3.0 km	MPC · JPL
652859	2014 FL_{45}	—	March 11, 2014	Mount Lemmon	Mount Lemmon Survey	·	2.5 km	MPC · JPL
652860	2014 FU_{45}	—	November 11, 2001	Apache Point	SDSS Collaboration	·	2.2 km	MPC · JPL
652861	2014 FW_{46}	—	December 1, 2005	Kitt Peak	Wasserman, L. H., Millis, R. L.	·	1.0 km	MPC · JPL
652862	2014 FF_{47}	—	February 26, 2014	Haleakala	Pan-STARRS 1	·	670 m	MPC · JPL
652863	2014 FB_{49}	—	March 8, 2003	Anderson Mesa	LONEOS	·	3.0 km	MPC · JPL
652864	2014 FY_{50}	—	January 23, 2014	Mount Lemmon	Mount Lemmon Survey	·	770 m	MPC · JPL
652865	2014 FZ_{51}	—	February 22, 2014	Mount Lemmon	Mount Lemmon Survey	L4	8.2 km	MPC · JPL
652866	2014 FC_{54}	—	March 22, 2014	Kitt Peak	Spacewatch	THM	2.3 km	MPC · JPL
652867	2014 FP_{58}	—	February 28, 2014	Haleakala	Pan-STARRS 1	·	550 m	MPC · JPL
652868	2014 FG_{61}	—	September 27, 2009	Kitt Peak	Spacewatch	L4	6.2 km	MPC · JPL
652869	2014 FP_{62}	—	March 27, 2001	Kitt Peak	Spacewatch	·	1.9 km	MPC · JPL
652870	2014 FH_{63}	—	September 27, 2008	Mount Lemmon	Mount Lemmon Survey	·	1.5 km	MPC · JPL
652871	2014 FV_{63}	—	March 12, 2007	Kitt Peak	Spacewatch	·	650 m	MPC · JPL
652872	2014 FA_{64}	—	May 25, 2014	Haleakala	Pan-STARRS 1	EUP	2.8 km	MPC · JPL
652873	2014 FO_{65}	—	October 11, 2012	Haleakala	Pan-STARRS 1	·	780 m	MPC · JPL
652874	2014 FP_{65}	—	October 11, 2007	Mount Lemmon	Mount Lemmon Survey	·	1.7 km	MPC · JPL
652875	2014 FK_{67}	—	October 9, 2008	Mount Lemmon	Mount Lemmon Survey	PHO	820 m	MPC · JPL
652876	2014 FM_{67}	—	March 26, 2007	Kitt Peak	Spacewatch	·	710 m	MPC · JPL
652877	2014 FR_{68}	—	May 6, 2014	Mount Lemmon	Mount Lemmon Survey	·	3.0 km	MPC · JPL
652878	2014 FZ_{72}	—	March 27, 2014	Haleakala	Pan-STARRS 1	H	350 m	MPC · JPL
652879	2014 FQ_{79}	—	September 30, 2017	Haleakala	Pan-STARRS 1	·	2.2 km	MPC · JPL
652880	2014 FE_{82}	—	March 29, 2014	Mount Lemmon	Mount Lemmon Survey	·	2.7 km	MPC · JPL
652881	2014 FJ_{83}	—	March 28, 2014	Mount Lemmon	Mount Lemmon Survey	·	2.5 km	MPC · JPL
652882	2014 FW_{83}	—	March 27, 2014	Haleakala	Pan-STARRS 1	MAS	540 m	MPC · JPL
652883	2014 FM_{84}	—	March 24, 2014	Haleakala	Pan-STARRS 1	·	2.0 km	MPC · JPL
652884	2014 FX_{84}	—	March 25, 2014	Kitt Peak	Spacewatch	VER	2.2 km	MPC · JPL
652885	2014 FD_{85}	—	March 26, 2014	Mount Lemmon	Mount Lemmon Survey	V	490 m	MPC · JPL
652886	2014 FZ_{85}	—	March 24, 2014	Haleakala	Pan-STARRS 1	·	950 m	MPC · JPL
652887	2014 FG_{86}	—	March 25, 2014	Mount Lemmon	Mount Lemmon Survey	·	640 m	MPC · JPL
652888	2014 FH_{86}	—	March 26, 2014	Mount Lemmon	Mount Lemmon Survey	·	980 m	MPC · JPL
652889	2014 FM_{86}	—	March 24, 2014	Haleakala	Pan-STARRS 1	·	720 m	MPC · JPL
652890	2014 FK_{87}	—	March 28, 2014	Mount Lemmon	Mount Lemmon Survey	·	3.1 km	MPC · JPL
652891	2014 GU_{9}	—	April 2, 2014	Mount Lemmon	Mount Lemmon Survey	·	1.6 km	MPC · JPL
652892	2014 GZ_{9}	—	April 2, 2014	Kitt Peak	Spacewatch	·	1.3 km	MPC · JPL
652893	2014 GM_{10}	—	February 26, 2014	Kitt Peak	Spacewatch	·	570 m	MPC · JPL
652894	2014 GN_{10}	—	September 11, 2007	Mount Lemmon	Mount Lemmon Survey	L4	8.5 km	MPC · JPL
652895	2014 GY_{10}	—	April 2, 2014	Mount Lemmon	Mount Lemmon Survey	·	2.5 km	MPC · JPL
652896	2014 GB_{13}	—	November 12, 2012	ESA OGS	ESA OGS	·	1.8 km	MPC · JPL
652897	2014 GJ_{14}	—	February 9, 2010	Mount Lemmon	Mount Lemmon Survey	·	790 m	MPC · JPL
652898	2014 GE_{17}	—	December 20, 2009	Kitt Peak	Spacewatch	·	830 m	MPC · JPL
652899	2014 GV_{22}	—	April 4, 2014	Mount Lemmon	Mount Lemmon Survey	V	510 m	MPC · JPL
652900	2014 GU_{23}	—	November 26, 2012	Mount Lemmon	Mount Lemmon Survey	·	2.3 km	MPC · JPL

== 652901–653000 ==
back to top

Designation			Discovery			Properties		Ref
Permanent	Provisional	Named after	Date	Site	Discoverer(s)	Category	Diam.	Ref
652901	2014 GK_{24}	—	December 31, 2007	Kitt Peak	Spacewatch	·	2.5 km	MPC · JPL
652902	2014 GG_{25}	—	April 4, 2014	Mount Lemmon	Mount Lemmon Survey	·	780 m	MPC · JPL
652903	2014 GH_{25}	—	March 29, 2014	Mount Lemmon	Mount Lemmon Survey	·	1.9 km	MPC · JPL
652904	2014 GE_{28}	—	May 28, 2008	Mount Lemmon	Mount Lemmon Survey	·	3.2 km	MPC · JPL
652905	2014 GG_{29}	—	September 26, 2011	Haleakala	Pan-STARRS 1	MAS	610 m	MPC · JPL
652906	2014 GR_{35}	—	April 1, 2014	Kitt Peak	Spacewatch	·	850 m	MPC · JPL
652907	2014 GC_{36}	—	April 2, 2014	Kitt Peak	Spacewatch	·	2.7 km	MPC · JPL
652908	2014 GU_{36}	—	April 3, 2014	XuYi	PMO NEO Survey Program	·	2.2 km	MPC · JPL
652909	2014 GK_{37}	—	March 24, 2014	Haleakala	Pan-STARRS 1	V	600 m	MPC · JPL
652910	2014 GN_{37}	—	April 4, 2014	Kitt Peak	Spacewatch	·	1.2 km	MPC · JPL
652911	2014 GL_{38}	—	February 20, 2014	Haleakala	Pan-STARRS 1	·	750 m	MPC · JPL
652912	2014 GY_{41}	—	October 28, 1995	Kitt Peak	Spacewatch	MAR	1.2 km	MPC · JPL
652913	2014 GH_{43}	—	October 14, 2001	Apache Point	SDSS Collaboration	·	1.9 km	MPC · JPL
652914	2014 GQ_{47}	—	April 7, 2014	Les Engarouines	L. Bernasconi	T_{j} (2.98) · EUP	4.5 km	MPC · JPL
652915	2014 GO_{48}	—	September 27, 2012	Haleakala	Pan-STARRS 1	·	3.1 km	MPC · JPL
652916	2014 GT_{50}	—	March 25, 2014	Mount Lemmon	Mount Lemmon Survey	·	3.3 km	MPC · JPL
652917	2014 GY_{50}	—	November 1, 2005	Mauna Kea	P. A. Wiegert, D. D. Balam	TIR	2.6 km	MPC · JPL
652918	2014 GP_{52}	—	February 29, 2008	Mount Lemmon	Mount Lemmon Survey	·	2.5 km	MPC · JPL
652919	2014 GZ_{52}	—	April 10, 2014	Haleakala	Pan-STARRS 1	H	420 m	MPC · JPL
652920	2014 GR_{53}	—	April 4, 2014	Haleakala	Pan-STARRS 1	centaur	129 km	MPC · JPL
652921	2014 GE_{56}	—	September 18, 2003	Palomar	NEAT	·	1.5 km	MPC · JPL
652922	2014 GM_{56}	—	February 5, 2010	Kitt Peak	Spacewatch	·	980 m	MPC · JPL
652923	2014 GD_{57}	—	April 5, 2014	Haleakala	Pan-STARRS 1	·	540 m	MPC · JPL
652924	2014 GF_{57}	—	April 5, 2014	Haleakala	Pan-STARRS 1	V	450 m	MPC · JPL
652925	2014 GY_{57}	—	April 5, 2014	Haleakala	Pan-STARRS 1	EOS	1.4 km	MPC · JPL
652926	2014 GG_{58}	—	April 5, 2014	Haleakala	Pan-STARRS 1	·	1.0 km	MPC · JPL
652927	2014 GL_{59}	—	November 27, 2012	Mount Lemmon	Mount Lemmon Survey	(5)	1.1 km	MPC · JPL
652928	2014 GU_{61}	—	December 4, 2008	Kitt Peak	Spacewatch	V	680 m	MPC · JPL
652929	2014 GY_{61}	—	April 5, 2014	Haleakala	Pan-STARRS 1	·	2.1 km	MPC · JPL
652930	2014 GH_{63}	—	April 5, 2014	Haleakala	Pan-STARRS 1	·	2.0 km	MPC · JPL
652931	2014 GV_{64}	—	November 8, 2007	Kitt Peak	Spacewatch	·	2.0 km	MPC · JPL
652932	2014 GS_{74}	—	April 1, 2014	Kitt Peak	Spacewatch	·	760 m	MPC · JPL
652933	2014 GT_{75}	—	April 5, 2014	Haleakala	Pan-STARRS 1	·	2.5 km	MPC · JPL
652934	2014 GP_{77}	—	April 7, 2014	Mount Lemmon	Mount Lemmon Survey	EOS	1.5 km	MPC · JPL
652935	2014 GS_{82}	—	April 4, 2014	Haleakala	Pan-STARRS 1	·	980 m	MPC · JPL
652936	2014 GK_{91}	—	April 8, 2014	Mount Lemmon	Mount Lemmon Survey	·	2.9 km	MPC · JPL
652937	2014 HB_{1}	—	March 22, 2003	Palomar	NEAT	H	600 m	MPC · JPL
652938	2014 HH_{1}	—	March 24, 2014	Haleakala	Pan-STARRS 1	·	990 m	MPC · JPL
652939	2014 HH_{2}	—	September 23, 2004	Kitt Peak	Spacewatch	H	430 m	MPC · JPL
652940	2014 HG_{7}	—	January 31, 2004	Kitt Peak	Spacewatch	·	1.8 km	MPC · JPL
652941	2014 HD_{8}	—	April 20, 2014	Mount Lemmon	Mount Lemmon Survey	·	950 m	MPC · JPL
652942	2014 HC_{9}	—	February 9, 2013	Haleakala	Pan-STARRS 1	·	2.3 km	MPC · JPL
652943	2014 HV_{9}	—	May 6, 2008	Mount Lemmon	Mount Lemmon Survey	·	970 m	MPC · JPL
652944	2014 HY_{9}	—	May 18, 2005	Palomar	NEAT	·	2.1 km	MPC · JPL
652945	2014 HJ_{11}	—	September 22, 2008	Kitt Peak	Spacewatch	L4	8.4 km	MPC · JPL
652946	2014 HF_{13}	—	December 24, 2005	Kitt Peak	Spacewatch	NYS	970 m	MPC · JPL
652947	2014 HG_{13}	—	April 5, 2014	Haleakala	Pan-STARRS 1	·	2.8 km	MPC · JPL
652948	2014 HS_{14}	—	October 24, 2011	Haleakala	Pan-STARRS 1	EOS	1.7 km	MPC · JPL
652949	2014 HV_{16}	—	April 21, 2014	Mount Lemmon	Mount Lemmon Survey	·	1.7 km	MPC · JPL
652950	2014 HZ_{16}	—	May 10, 2005	Cerro Tololo	Deep Ecliptic Survey	AGN	900 m	MPC · JPL
652951	2014 HS_{18}	—	August 23, 2011	Haleakala	Pan-STARRS 1	MAS	600 m	MPC · JPL
652952	2014 HO_{21}	—	April 4, 2014	Kitt Peak	Spacewatch	·	1.1 km	MPC · JPL
652953	2014 HV_{23}	—	April 5, 2014	Haleakala	Pan-STARRS 1	MAS	610 m	MPC · JPL
652954	2014 HQ_{24}	—	September 21, 2011	Mount Lemmon	Mount Lemmon Survey	MAS	750 m	MPC · JPL
652955	2014 HO_{28}	—	August 29, 2000	La Silla	Barbieri, C.	KOR	1.5 km	MPC · JPL
652956	2014 HU_{28}	—	August 18, 2006	Palomar	NEAT	·	2.1 km	MPC · JPL
652957	2014 HD_{29}	—	March 27, 2014	Haleakala	Pan-STARRS 1	·	1.1 km	MPC · JPL
652958	2014 HW_{29}	—	December 18, 2009	Mount Lemmon	Mount Lemmon Survey	·	630 m	MPC · JPL
652959	2014 HM_{33}	—	October 27, 2005	Catalina	CSS	PHO	830 m	MPC · JPL
652960	2014 HW_{33}	—	March 16, 2007	Kitt Peak	Spacewatch	·	790 m	MPC · JPL
652961	2014 HG_{34}	—	April 4, 2014	Haleakala	Pan-STARRS 1	·	1.1 km	MPC · JPL
652962	2014 HN_{36}	—	January 24, 2007	Mount Lemmon	Mount Lemmon Survey	·	2.4 km	MPC · JPL
652963	2014 HS_{38}	—	February 9, 2010	Mount Lemmon	Mount Lemmon Survey	·	840 m	MPC · JPL
652964	2014 HV_{39}	—	March 25, 2014	Kitt Peak	Spacewatch	EOS	1.7 km	MPC · JPL
652965	2014 HX_{39}	—	September 19, 1998	Apache Point	SDSS Collaboration	(2076)	750 m	MPC · JPL
652966	2014 HD_{40}	—	December 17, 2009	Mount Lemmon	Mount Lemmon Survey	·	620 m	MPC · JPL
652967	2014 HP_{41}	—	April 23, 2014	Cerro Tololo-DECam	DECam	·	900 m	MPC · JPL
652968	2014 HA_{42}	—	April 23, 2014	Cerro Tololo-DECam	DECam	·	530 m	MPC · JPL
652969	2014 HV_{43}	—	April 30, 2003	Kitt Peak	Spacewatch	·	950 m	MPC · JPL
652970	2014 HK_{46}	—	April 20, 2006	Mount Lemmon	Mount Lemmon Survey	H	430 m	MPC · JPL
652971	2014 HD_{47}	—	August 27, 2006	Kitt Peak	Spacewatch	·	1.8 km	MPC · JPL
652972	2014 HD_{48}	—	March 16, 2007	Kitt Peak	Spacewatch	·	580 m	MPC · JPL
652973	2014 HM_{48}	—	February 8, 2008	Kitt Peak	Spacewatch	·	2.0 km	MPC · JPL
652974	2014 HP_{50}	—	April 23, 2014	Cerro Tololo-DECam	DECam	·	2.4 km	MPC · JPL
652975	2014 HG_{51}	—	March 31, 2014	Mount Lemmon	Mount Lemmon Survey	·	2.1 km	MPC · JPL
652976	2014 HF_{54}	—	April 23, 2014	Cerro Tololo-DECam	DECam	·	2.3 km	MPC · JPL
652977	2014 HY_{56}	—	April 23, 2014	Cerro Tololo-DECam	DECam	·	830 m	MPC · JPL
652978	2014 HD_{59}	—	August 20, 2000	Kitt Peak	Spacewatch	·	800 m	MPC · JPL
652979	2014 HK_{59}	—	April 24, 2003	Kitt Peak	Spacewatch	ERI	1.4 km	MPC · JPL
652980	2014 HH_{62}	—	August 29, 2005	Kitt Peak	Spacewatch	·	2.1 km	MPC · JPL
652981	2014 HN_{70}	—	October 10, 2005	Catalina	CSS	·	580 m	MPC · JPL
652982	2014 HR_{72}	—	April 15, 2007	Mount Lemmon	Mount Lemmon Survey	·	500 m	MPC · JPL
652983	2014 HL_{74}	—	April 23, 2014	Cerro Tololo-DECam	DECam	·	2.1 km	MPC · JPL
652984	2014 HN_{76}	—	October 11, 2012	Mount Lemmon	Mount Lemmon Survey	·	480 m	MPC · JPL
652985	2014 HS_{78}	—	April 24, 2014	Haleakala	Pan-STARRS 1	·	900 m	MPC · JPL
652986	2014 HX_{84}	—	August 31, 2005	Kitt Peak	Spacewatch	·	2.3 km	MPC · JPL
652987	2014 HB_{90}	—	April 23, 2014	Cerro Tololo-DECam	DECam	·	580 m	MPC · JPL
652988	2014 HK_{94}	—	April 23, 2014	Cerro Tololo-DECam	DECam	·	2.1 km	MPC · JPL
652989	2014 HO_{95}	—	April 23, 2014	Cerro Tololo-DECam	DECam	·	2.3 km	MPC · JPL
652990	2014 HV_{95}	—	April 24, 2014	Mount Lemmon	Mount Lemmon Survey	·	2.4 km	MPC · JPL
652991	2014 HD_{96}	—	April 23, 2014	Cerro Tololo-DECam	DECam	V	590 m	MPC · JPL
652992	2014 HJ_{96}	—	April 23, 2014	Cerro Tololo-DECam	DECam	·	2.0 km	MPC · JPL
652993	2014 HD_{97}	—	April 23, 2014	Cerro Tololo-DECam	DECam	·	2.7 km	MPC · JPL
652994	2014 HQ_{102}	—	April 5, 2014	Haleakala	Pan-STARRS 1	·	2.2 km	MPC · JPL
652995	2014 HZ_{103}	—	February 14, 2010	Mount Lemmon	Mount Lemmon Survey	·	680 m	MPC · JPL
652996	2014 HG_{105}	—	August 1, 2011	Haleakala	Pan-STARRS 1	V	520 m	MPC · JPL
652997	2014 HJ_{106}	—	April 24, 2014	Mount Lemmon	Mount Lemmon Survey	·	600 m	MPC · JPL
652998	2014 HR_{106}	—	July 6, 2003	Kitt Peak	Spacewatch	·	1.0 km	MPC · JPL
652999	2014 HV_{108}	—	August 2, 2016	Haleakala	Pan-STARRS 1	HYG	2.0 km	MPC · JPL
653000	2014 HM_{110}	—	April 24, 2014	Mount Lemmon	Mount Lemmon Survey	·	1.9 km	MPC · JPL

back to top

== Meaning of names ==
As minor planet discoveries are confirmed, they are given a permanent number by the IAU's Minor Planet Center (MPC), and the discoverers can then submit names for them, following the IAU's naming conventions. The list below concerns those minor planets in the specified number-range that have received names, and explains the meanings of those names.

Official naming citations of newly named small Solar System bodies are approved and published in a bulletin by IAU's Working Group for Small Bodies Nomenclature (WGSBN). Before May 2021, citations were published in MPC's Minor Planet Circulars for many decades. Recent citations can also be found on the JPL Small-Body Database (SBDB). Until his death in 2016, German astronomer Lutz D. Schmadel compiled these citations into the Dictionary of Minor Planet Names (DMP) and regularly updated the collection.

Based on Paul Herget's The Names of the Minor Planets, Schmadel also researched the unclear origin of numerous asteroids, most of which had been named prior to World War II. This article incorporates text from this source, which is in the public domain: SBDB New namings may only be added to this list below after official publication as the preannouncement of names is condemned. The WGSBN publishes a comprehensive guideline for the naming rules of non-cometary small Solar System bodies.

Named minor planet	Provisional	This minor planet was named for...	Ref · Catalog
652031 Szczepaniak	2013 RS_{104}	Grzegorz Szczepaniak (b. 1970) is a Polish mountain tourist guide working in Żywiec. In 2023 he became The Ambassador of the city of Żywiec, for his active promotion of the region.	IAU · 652031
652223 Huangtushui	2013 WD_{13}	Huang Tu-shui, Taiwanese sculptor.	IAU · 652223
652410 Janmarszałek	2014 AZ_{11}	Jan Marszałek (1949–2017), a Polish machine mechanic who passionate about engineering and astronomy.	IAU · 652410
652509 Andrewcrossley	2014 BF_{77}	Andrew Richard Crossley, Canadian artist, musician and mechanic.	IAU · 652509
