= Varaždin bypass =

Highway in Varaždin, Croatia

Varaždin bypass is a 23.1 km (14.3 mi) long expressway that encircles the town of Varaždin (Croatia). For the vast majority of its route it is a two-lane road except for the south-eastern and largest portion of the northern part which has four lanes to support heavier traffic. All intersections of the bypass are exclusively of at-grade type, four of them being later reconstructed to a roundabout style. The bypass carries the number of the state road D2, though being concurrent with state road D3 at the eastern part of the route. It took almost 30 years for the bypass to be fully completed; it was built in five main phases.

== Northern section ==
The oldest part of the bypass is the 5.1 km (3.1 mi) long northern part between present-day Podravska and Hrašćica intersections, which was built between 1978 and 1979. It represents the only part of the bypass that passes through the inhabited part of the city, at its largest part through the area of the city's northern-most neighborhood called „Banfica“. It is made up of present-day city streets "Podravska Street" (Croatian: Podravska Ulica), "Koprivnička Street" (Croatian: Koprivnička Ulica) and "Optujska Street" (Croatian: Optujska Ulica). Northern section of the route is a four-lane highway, except for one segment of "Koprivnička Street" and two segments of "Optujska Street" which have one lane for each direction. This part of the bypass today sees a large number of traffic accidents due to unadjusted speed of truck and car drivers.

== Eastern section ==
The entire 5.0 km (3.1 mi) long eastern part of the bypass, built in two phases, passes through the strategically important Varaždin's eastern economic zone.

=== North-eastern subsection ===
North-eastern subsection, carried out of the Podravska intersection to the south direction, was officially opened for traffic in November 1985 – its 1.9 km (1.2 mi) long route required the construction of two overpasses (across R201 and R202 railroads) at the southern-most part of the subsection. The overpass above R201 railway (called „Gospodarska overpass“; Croatian: Nadvožnjak Gospodarska, during the time of Yugoslavia: „Overpass of November 29“; Croatian: Nadvožnjak 29.11.) physically separates from the circular route of the bypass, being built at almost right angles to the west just south of the overpass over R202 railway (called „Vilko Novak overpass“; Croatian: Nadvožnjak Vilka Novaka), at this point connecting the motorway with the city area (more precisely with the present-day Zagrebačka Ulica street). These two overpasses are connected with Gospodarska intersection (named after „Gospodarska Street“; Croatian: Gospodarska Ulica). North-eastern part of the bypass was intended to divert entire international and local traffic which flowed through the city center from direction of Hungary and Međimurje County, but also from Slovenia and Austria. This portion connected the traffic routes between Koprivnica and Zagreb, and with the connection to the previously constructed northern bypass, it enabled diversion of all traffic from Čakovec and Maribor to Zagreb. On this way, extremely difficult traffic situation in Varaždin became easier as the large international traffic (especially heavy trucks) from Austria to Zagreb and other cities in the region started to avoid the roads inside the city.

=== South-eastern subsection ===
Completion of the north-eastern part of the bypass, however, did not entirely resolve all traffic problems, because the part between Varaždin and the village of Turčin (5 km / 3.1 mi south) wasn't yet created. Eventually, 3.1 km (1.9 mi) long south-eastern subsection between Gospodarska intersection and Turčin was opened in 1990 as a two-lane motorway. In July 1998, upon completion of the A4 section between Čakovec and Varaždin, Kneginec intersection was created, as the state road 528 (which offers Varaždin freeway connection) was carried out of the bypass. Before the south-eastern subsection came into existence, the main way to travel from Varaždin towards south and vice versa was through Zagrebačka Ulica street (during the time of Yugoslavia: „Marshal Tito's Street“; Croatian: Ulica Maršala Tita), with the route located between the city area and Turčin that stretches on the west side from the present-day bypass). As the subsection of the bypass included building of the 1.3 km (0.8 mi) long portion of the road south from present-day Kneginec intersection (today part of the state road D3), northern part of Zagrebačka Ulica became physically interrupted in Turčin, though a connection to the newly built portion is arranged in a way of turning it into a major corridor some 1 km (0.6 mi) before its dead end. State road D3 nowadays covers the original corridor of Zagrebačka Ulica between the point of its northern part termination and the village of Presečno, bearing the same street name. South-eastern subsection was upgraded to four-lane highway between 2012 and 2014.

== Western section ==
Western section of the bypass was built in two phases - 4.6 km (2.8 mi) long north-western subsection between intersections Hrašćica and Nedeljanec was opened in 2004 and the last, south-western subsection (between intersections Nedeljanec and Kneginec, in the length of 8.4 km/5.2 mi) was opened in November 2007. This route solves transit traffic through the city of Varaždin in the direction of Western Europe (Austria, Slovenia) towards Zagreb and the Adriatic, which posed major traffic problems in the city's road network. South-western subsection required the construction of the following facilities: two intersections, two road crossings, four overpasses (Gojanec 1, Gojanec 2, Črnec and Turčin), one bridge (Plitvica) and one wildlife passage. Western part is the only section of the bypass that doesn't pass through the administrative region of the City of Varaždin, except for the small 1 km (0.6 mi) long portion that stretches through the area where Nedeljanec intersection is installed.
