= Filić =

Filić may refer to:

- Filić, Serbia, a village in Vojvodina
- Filić, Italy, a town in the province of Campobasso, best known as San Felice del Molise
- Filić (surname), a South Slavic surname found in Croatia and Serbia
