= Jalkovec =

- Village
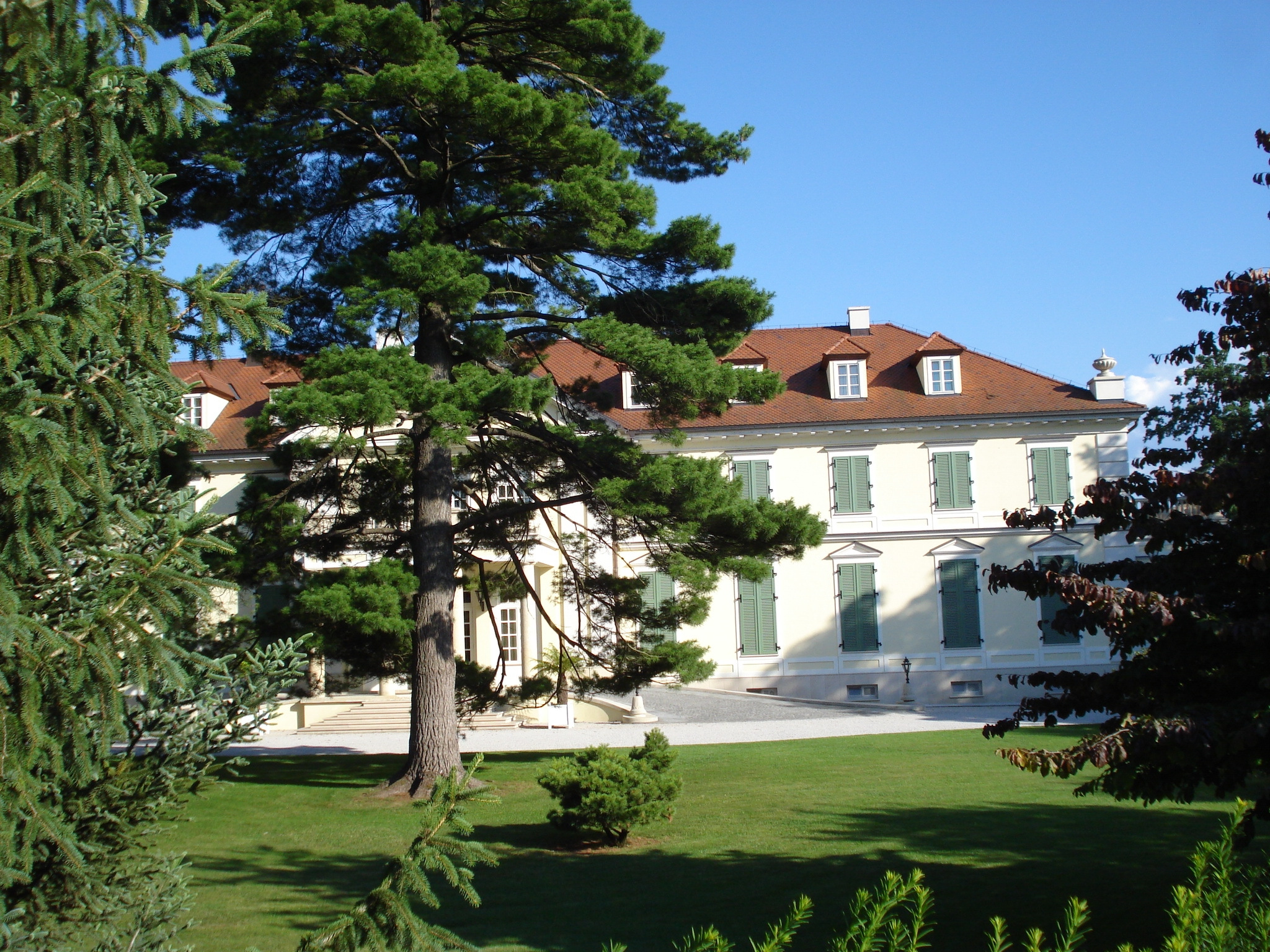
- Jalkovec Castle near Varaždin, Croatia (northwest view), built in 1911 by the nobleman Stjepan Leitner

- Location of Jalkovec in Croatia
- Coordinates: 46°16′46″N 16°19′12″E
- Country: Croatia
- County: Varaždin County
- City: Varaždin

Area
  - Total: 3.8 km^{2} (1.5 sq mi)

Population (2021)
  - Total: 1,259
  - Density: 330/km^{2} (860/sq mi)
- Time zone: UTC+1 (CET)
  - Summer (DST): UTC+2 (CEST)
- Postal code: 42000 Varaždin
- Area code: +385 (0)42

Jalkovec is a village in northern Croatia, located southwest of Varaždin. The population of the village in the 2011 census was 1,309.

== History ==
In 1911, Stjepan Leitner demolished the old curia in Jalkovec in order to build a manor, designed by Paul Schultze-Naumburg.
