= Varaždin =

City in Varaždin County, Croatia

- City
- Grad Varaždin; City of Varaždin
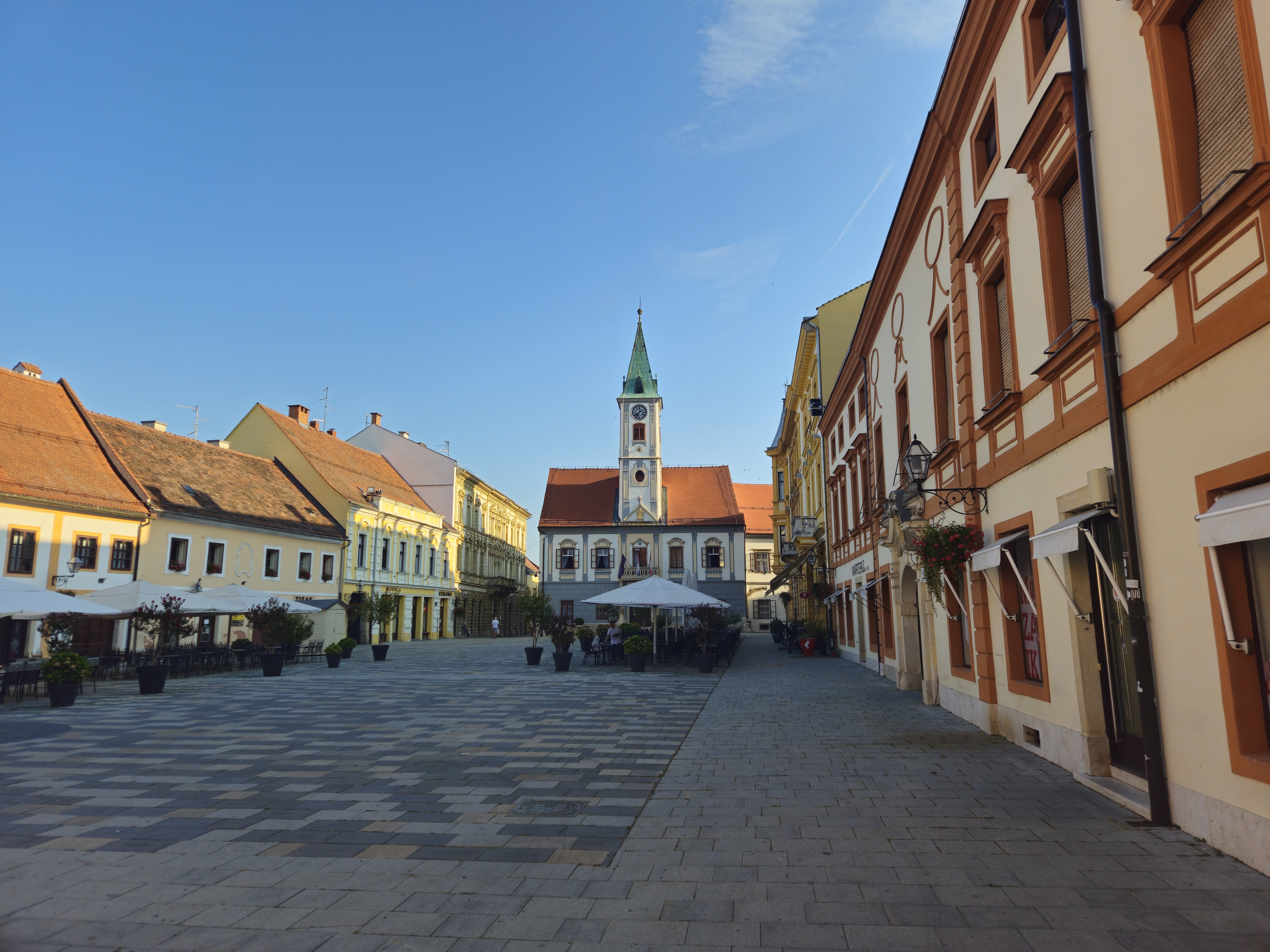
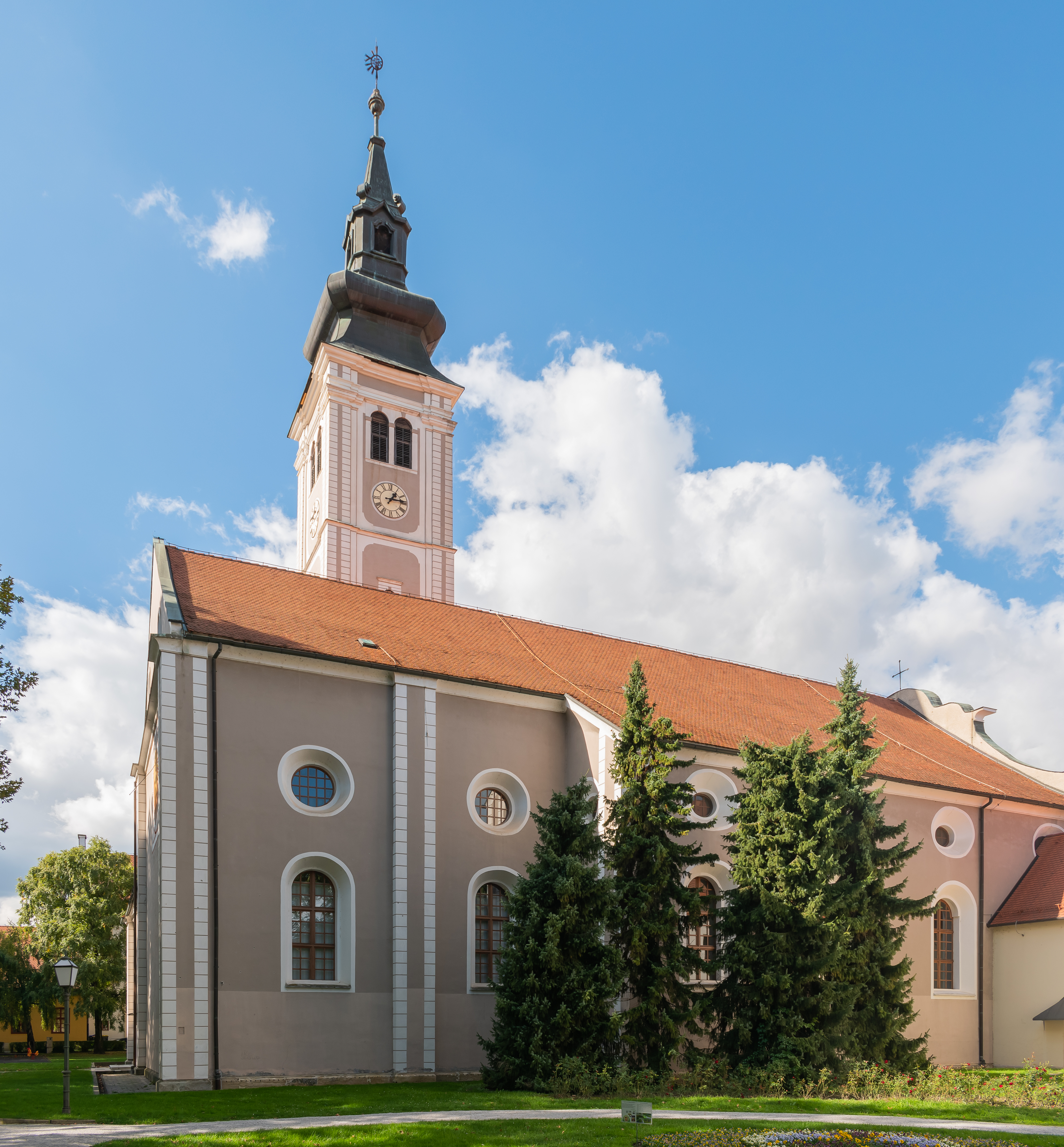
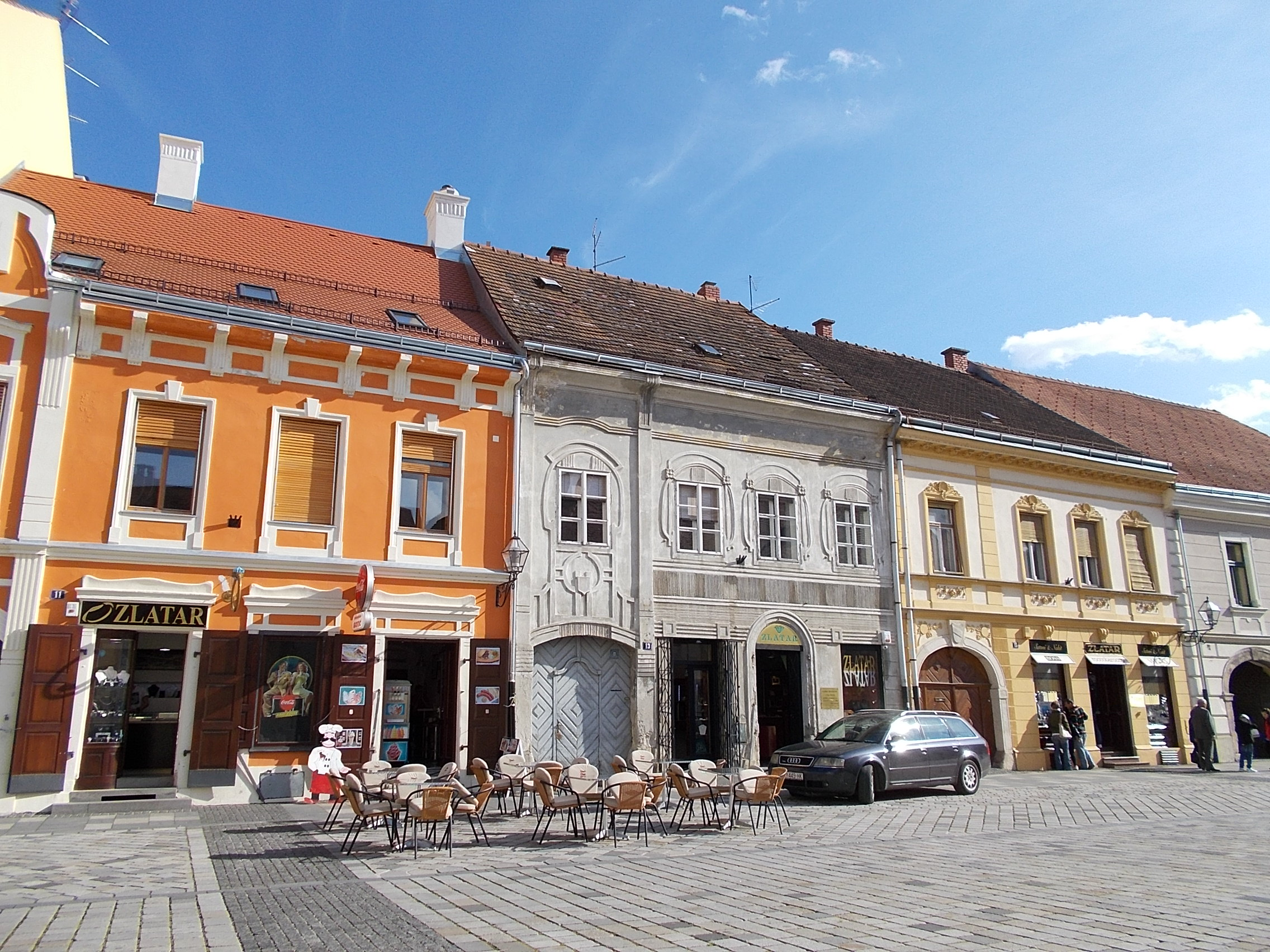
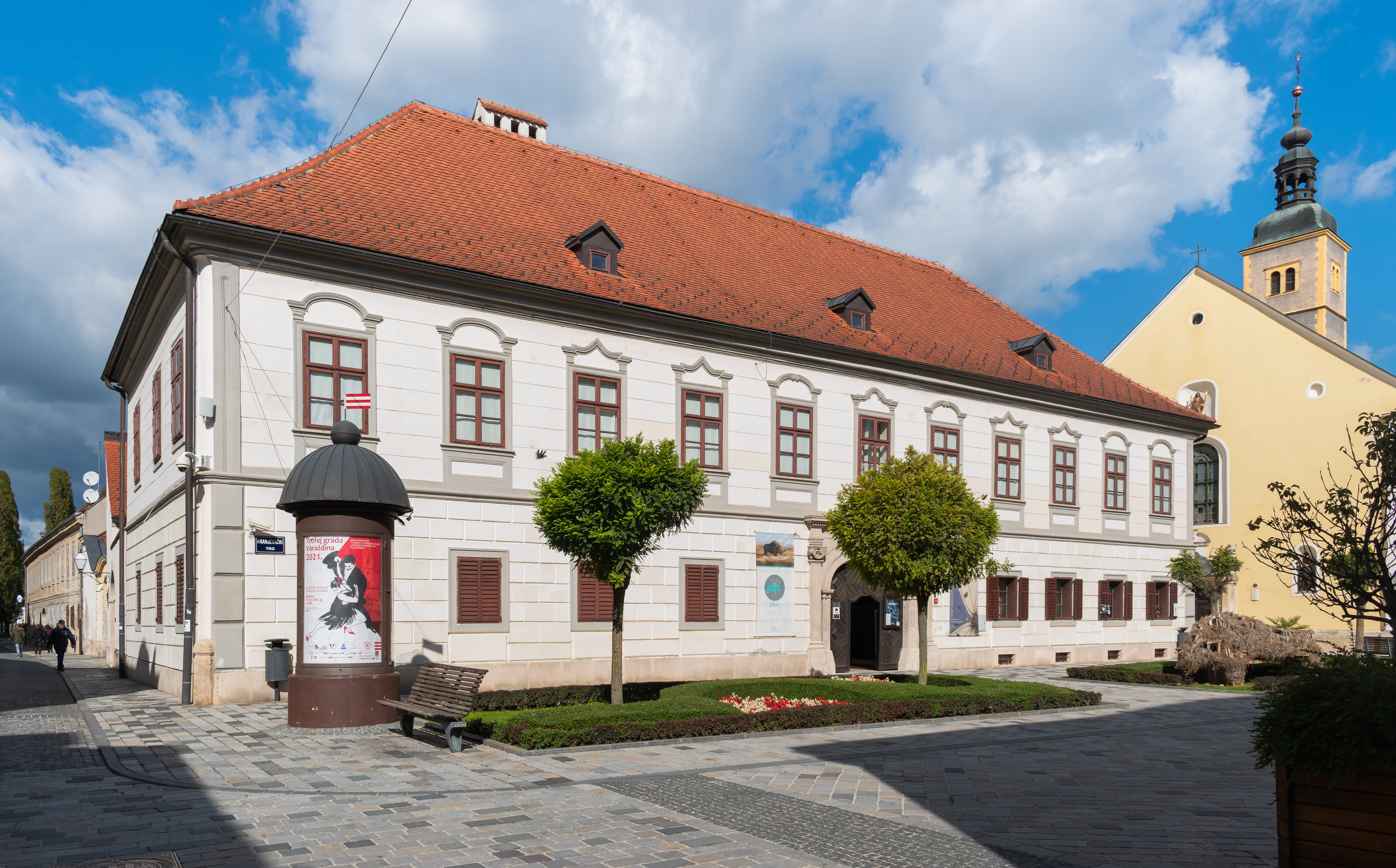
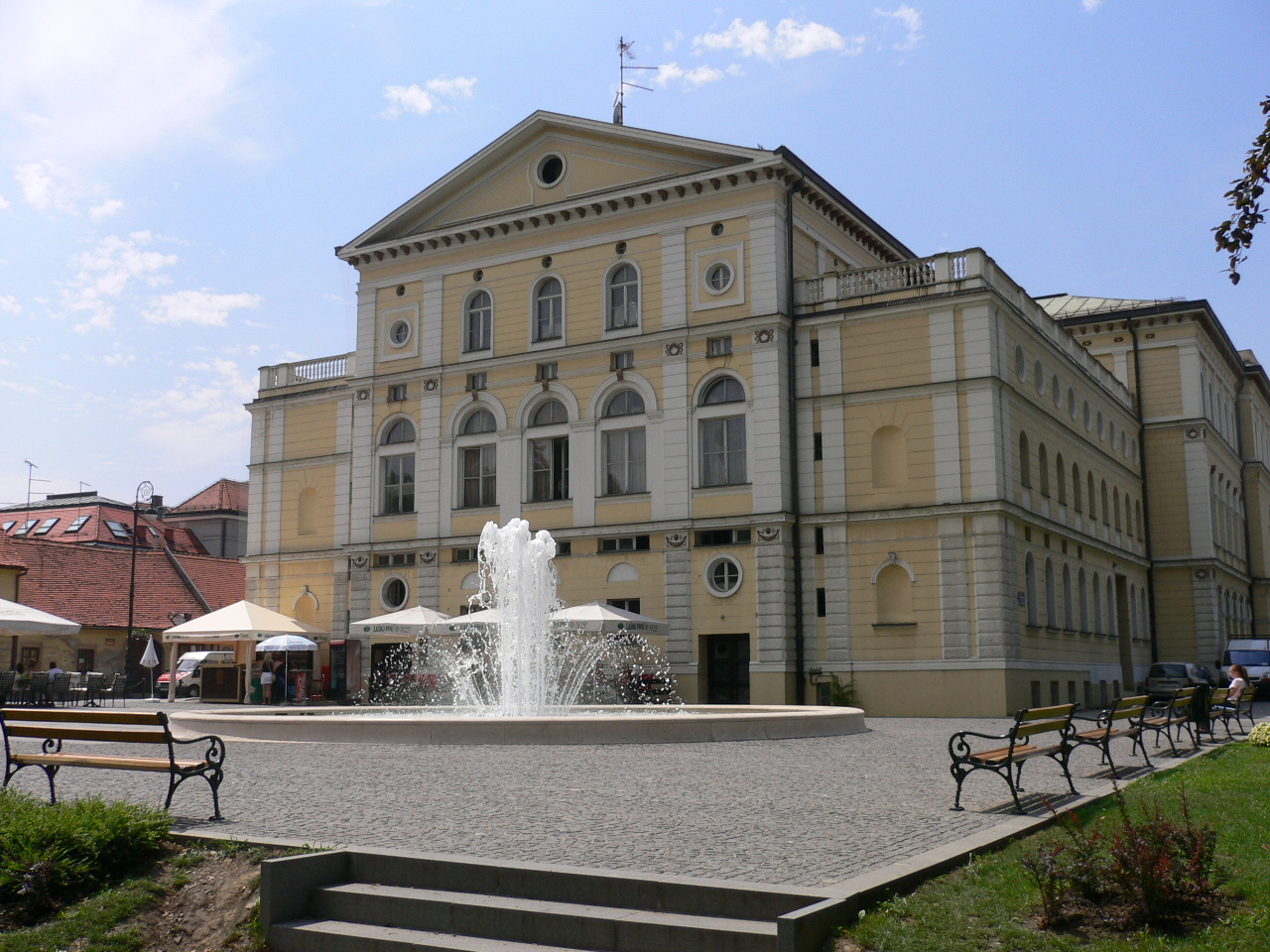
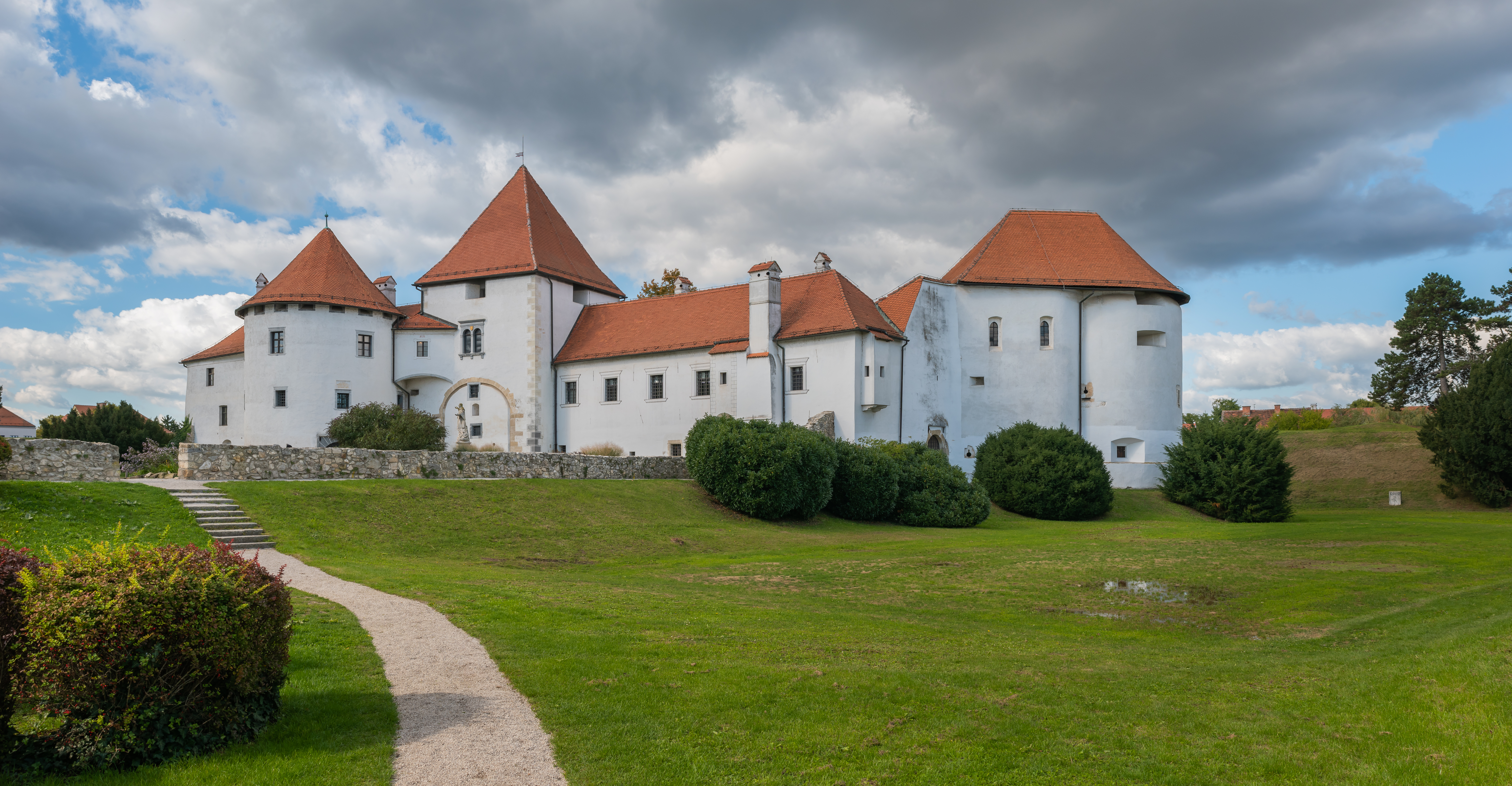
- Korzo Cathedral Franciscan Square Herzer Palace National Theater Varaždin Castle

- Flag Coat of arms
- Motto: Probitati et bonis artibus (English: For Honesty and Good Virtues)
- Interactive map of Varaždin
- Location of Varaždin within Croatia
- Coordinates: 46°18′29″N 16°20′16″E
- Country: Croatia
- Region: Northern Croatia
- County: Varaždin County

Government
  - Mayor: Neven Bosilj (SDP)
  - City Council: 21 members: SDP (13); HDZ–SUS (4); Možemo! (2); NS-R (1); HS (1)

Area
  - City: 59.9 km^{2} (23.1 sq mi)
  - Urban: 34.5 km^{2} (13.3 sq mi)
- Elevation: 173 m (568 ft)

Population (2021)
  - City: 43,782
  - Density: 731/km^{2} (1,890/sq mi)
  - Urban: 36,187
  - Urban density: 1,050/km^{2} (2,720/sq mi)
- Time zone: UTC+1 (CET)
  - Summer (DST): UTC+2 (CEST)
- Postal code: HR-42 000
- Area code: +385 42
- Vehicle registration: VŽ
- Patron saints: St. Nicholas
- Website: varazdin.hr

Historical Affiliations

Kingdom of Croatia (925–1102)
Kingdom of Croatia (Note: In personal union with Hungary) (1102–1526)
Habsburg Monarchy (1527–1804)
Austrian Empire (1804–1867)
Austria-Hungary (1867–1918)
State of Slovenes, Croats and Serbs (1918)
Kingdom of Yugoslavia (Note: Known as: Kingdom of Serbs, Croats and Slovenes (1918–1929)) (1918–1941)
Independent State of Croatia (1941–1945)
SFR Yugoslavia (Note: Known as: Federal People's Republic of Yugoslavia (1945–1963); Socialist Federal Republic of Yugoslavia (1963–1992)) (1945–1991)
Croatia (1991–present)

Varaždin (pronounced [ˈʋâraʒdiːn] or [ʋaˈrǎʒdin]; Hungarian: Varasd, also known by alternative names) is a city in Northern Croatia, 81 km (50 mi) north-east of Zagreb. The total population is 46,946, with 38,839 in the city settlement itself (2011).

The city is best known for its baroque buildings, music, textile, food and IT industry.

== Name ==
In Hungarian the town is known as Varasd, in Latin as Varasdinum and in German as Warasdin. The Hungarian Varasd is composed of város meaning city and the diminutive suffix -d.

== Population ==
Historical population
Year	Pop.	±%
1857	11,560	—
1869	12,188	+5.4%
1880	12,116	−0.6%
1890	13,021	+7.5%
1900	14,931	+14.7%
1910	16,925	+13.4%
1921	17,441	+3.0%
1931	17,112	−1.9%
1948	21,602	+26.2%
1953	23,743	+9.9%
1961	31,243	+31.6%
1971	39,383	+26.1%
1981	45,844	+16.4%
1991	48,834	+6.5%
2001	49,075	+0.5%
2011	46,946	−4.3%
2021	43,782	−6.7%
Source: Naselja i stanovništvo Republike Hrvatske 1857–2021, DZS

The total population of the city is 46,946 and it includes the following settlements:

- Črnec Biškupečki, population 696
- Donji Kućan, population 716
- Gojanec, population 620
- Gornji Kućan, population 1,139
- Hrašćica, population 1,283
- Jalkovec, population 1,309
- Kućan Marof, population 1,388
- Poljana Biškupečka, population 452
- Varaždin, population 38,839
- Zbelava, population 504
City of Varaždin: Population trends 1857–2021
v

population	11560	12188	12116	13021	14931	16925	17441	17112	21602	23743	31243	39383	45844	48834	49075	46946	43782
	1857	1869	1880	1890	1900	1910	1921	1931	1948	1953	1961	1971	1981	1991	2001	2011	2021

Sources: Croatian Bureau of Statistics publications

== Administrative division ==
The administrative sections of Varaždin are local committees (mjesni odbori). These are:

- Centar
- 2nd Local Committee
- 3rd Local Committee
- 4th Local Committee
- 5th Local Committee
- Banfica
- Biškupec, Varaždin
- Hrašćica
- Gojanec
- Jalkovec
- Poljana Biškupečka
- Črnec Biškupečki
- Kućan Marof
- Gornji Kućan
- Donji Kućan
- Zbelava

== History ==
=== 12th-13th centuries ===
The first written reference to Varaždin, whose historical name is Garestin, was on 20 August 1181, when King Béla III mentioned the nearby thermal springs (Varaždinske Toplice) in a legal document.

Varaždin was declared a free royal borough in 1209 by the Hungarian King Andrew II. The town became the economic and military centre of northern Croatia. Due to Ottoman raids, the town was structured defensively around the old fortress, and acquired the shape of a typical medieval Wasserburg. In the early 13th century, the Knights Hospitaller (Croatian: Ivanovci) came to Varaždin, where they built the church and a monastery. In the mid-13th century, the church of St. John belonging to the Hospitallers was taken over by Franciscans, who extended it over several centuries, eventually replacing the medieval structures with early baroque.

=== 14th-15th centuries ===
At the end of the 14th century, Varaždin fortress passed to the hands of the Counts of Celje. Over the following centuries Varaždin had several owners, the most influential being Beatrice Frankopan (1480–1510), wife of Margrave Georg of Brandenburg-Ansbach, who built the town hall; her successor was Baron Ivan Ungnad (1493–1564), who reinforced the existing fortification. At the end of the 16th century Count Thomas Erdődy became its owner, assuming the hereditary position of Varaždin prefects (župan), and the fortress remained in the ownership of the Erdődy family until 1925.

=== 16th-17th centuries ===
The town was the seat of Slavonnian Military Border in late 16th century.

Destructions by fires and fire fighting measures

The 16th century is also the beginning of fires being recorded; starting with a fire in Varaždin in 1558, although no details are given.
We know more about the great fire of 27 May 1582, that had such dire effects that the Varaždin population counted time as "prior" and "after the Great fire". The losses include the parish church, the Franciscan church and a friary (subsequently the Franciscans left Varaždin), the chapels of St. Vid, Michael and Holy Trinity, the homes of the local tollhouse clerks and customs officers. (Note: Following the great fire of 27 May 1582, King Rudolf helped the local tollhouse clerks and customs officers to rebuild said homes with donations of 60 Hungarian forint to each clerk.) The stronghold was spared but the fire jumped the city walls and ravaged the suburbs close to the river Drava. The citizens asked the king for help and were granted state tax exoneration for the following six years by the Hungarian royal chamber, relieved from tax duty for one year and were assigned free serf labor. Austrian archduke Ernest wrote to Varaždin County officials on 9 July 1582 to provide free lumber for the citizens who had lost their homes in the fire. That fire prompted authorities, not only in Varaždin but also in other towns, to set up watch posts with guards on lookout for possible fire.

A fire on 29 April 1586, burned down a number of buildings. The following year, 1587, saw two fires: one on 10 May that burned 23 homes in the Royal street, and one on 26 December that burned only one home. At that time, Varaždin, contrary to some other towns, did not have any organized fire-fighting service. The next fire recorded, in 1592, brings in the town protocol the description of «pitiful and grieving town of Varaždin»; among the damages are noted that of several public buildings, including the town hall and St. Nicholas church. Another fire in 1599 destroyed 66 buildings in and around the street of St.Vid. 1599 also sees the town officials take the first fire fighting measures. (Note: In 1599, the town authorities decided upon some fire-fighting measures: from then on, each 10 homes had to provide 1 firm, long ladder and an iron bolt ("of medium size") that two people could put up on a roof in flames; in case of fire, these were to be carried to the spot of the fire. Not doing so incurred a fine of 2 Rhine forint. (Petrić 2008, p. 125)) This ordnance seems to have had some effect, as the next recorded fire dates from mid-17th century.

The great fire of 1646, that destroyed more than half the town and damaged many of the remaining buildings, did not deter the town's growth, as better buildings replaced the "ugly town district". Sigismund Trautmanstorf_{(de)}, a member of Austria's nobility, reports a fire on 1 May 1648, fuelled by high wind, that destroyed more than a half the town within its walls - several hundred of houses disappeared. The town magistrate asked King Ferdinand III to relieve the town from Royal chamber taxes, due to the current devastation; the king granted that request and on 27 October 1649 he pardoned the town from paying overdue taxes of 500 Hungarian forint, with the specific reason of «half of Varaždin perishing in the fire of 1 May 1648».

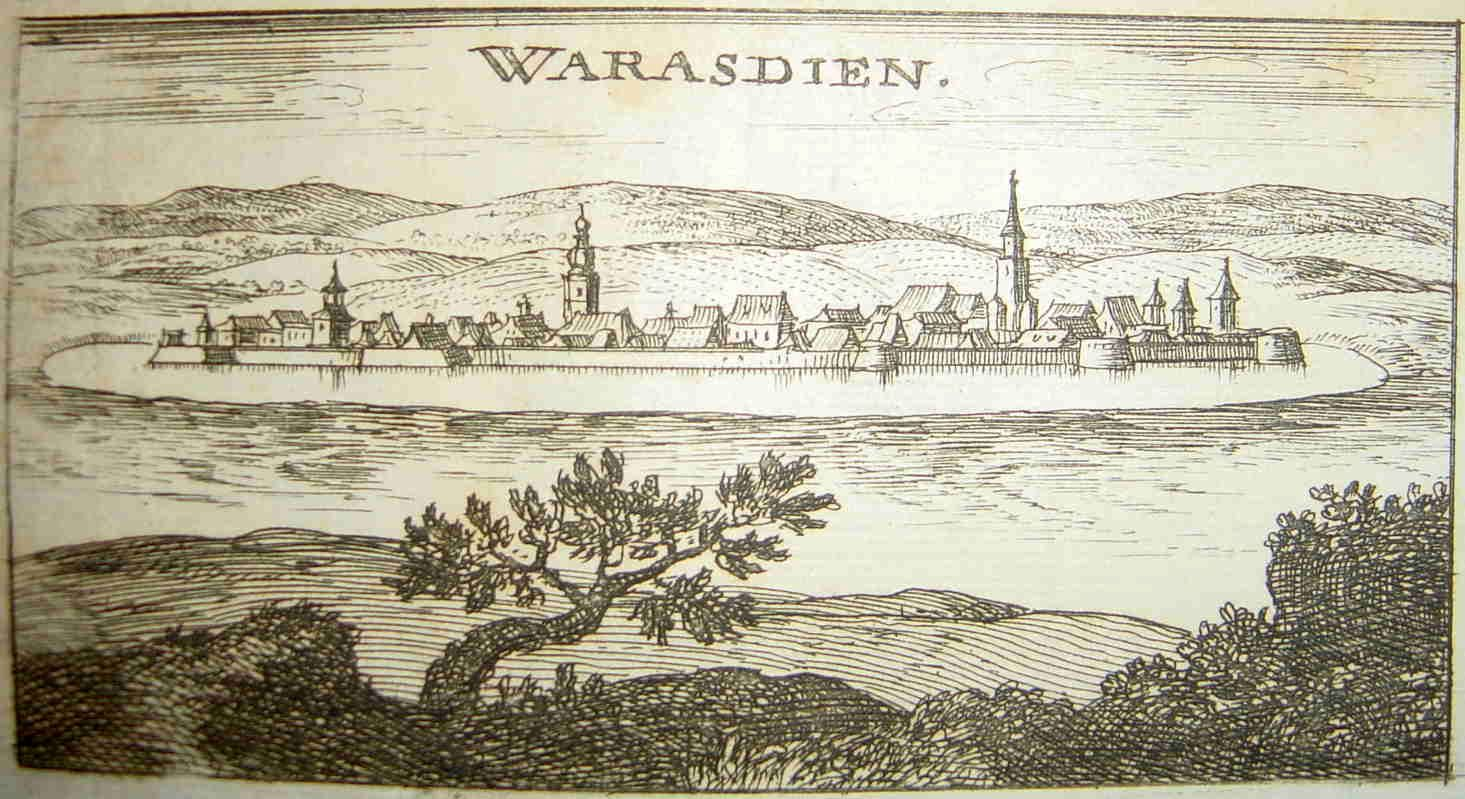
A German postcard depicting Varaždin (Warasdien) in 1668.

On Easter Monday of 27 March 1665, an extremely large fire started in Brodovski konec suburb (E-N-E of Varaždin) and, due to a strong wind, crossed the town walls and spread all over town. It destroyed Varaždin churches (parish church, Jesuit church and Franciscan church), spared only eight homes and new stables belonging to Varaždin stronghold's military commander; it also destroyed several towers from the town walls, albeit sparing the one used as main armoury - a lucky escape, as that one held the gunpowder magazine; thus sparing some lives. Beside the inner town buildings, the entire suburb outside the upper gates was also destroyed in the fire, from the east all the way to the stronghold's toll gates; this included part of the main street and Vidovski konec street, toward Biškupec village (about 3 km south of Varaždin); the next day the fire caught Vidovski konec and burned all its buildings down.
St. Florian's chapel was built in Varaždin in 1669, as a votive chapel after the 1665 fire (catholic patron saint St. Florian was believed to protect from fires, thus has many dedicated chapels and churches - such as that in Koprivnica, first mentioned in 1680, or in Križevci after their fire in 1735).

Fires in the 18th century include that of 1745, set up by soldiers spiteful of their lodgers, which destroyed a number of homes and a brewery.
In 1748 another fire destroyed much of the southern suburbs, including 119 homes and several hundred stables and barns.

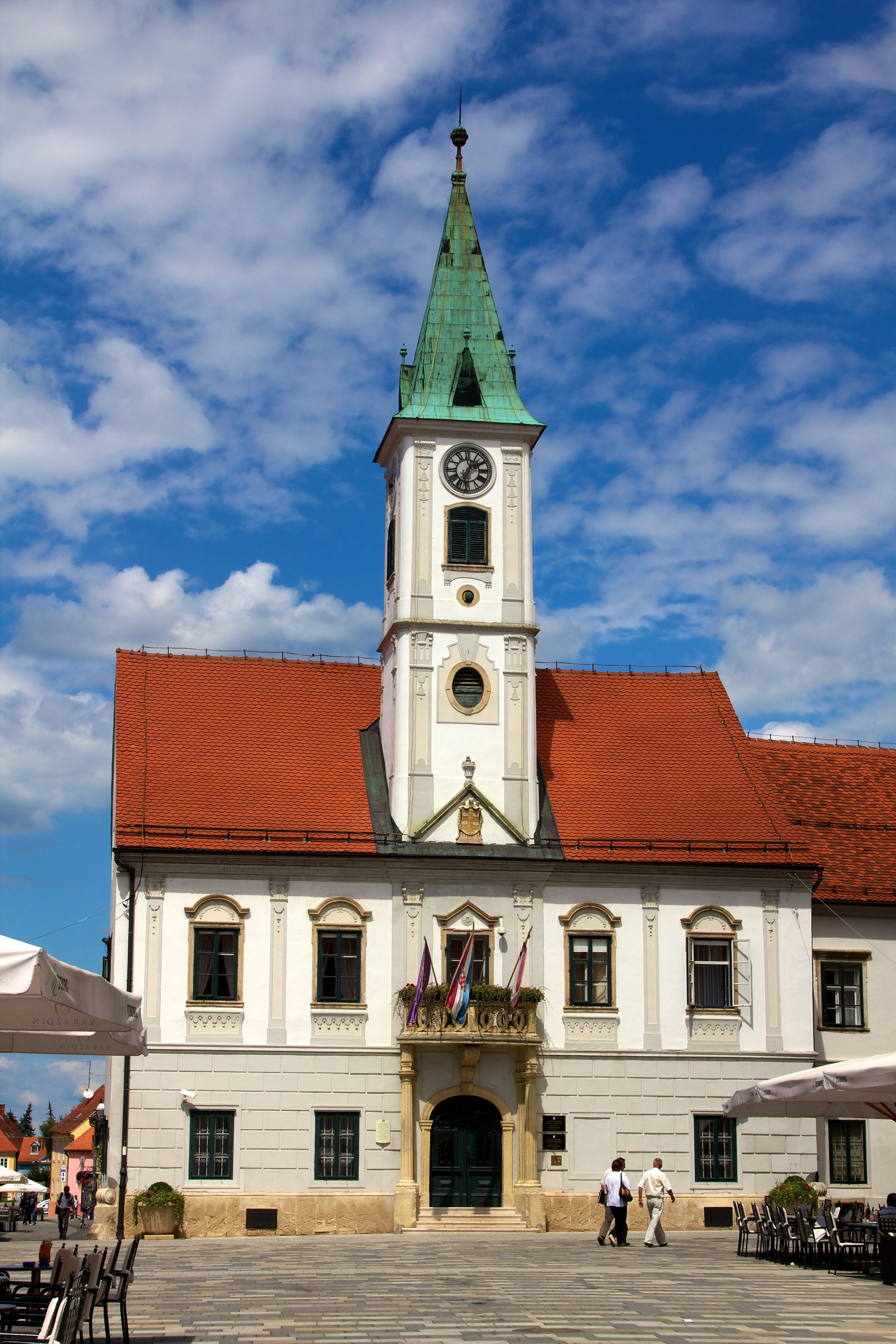
Varaždin Town Hall building was made in the Classicist style in 1793 by Franjo Losert.

In 1767, the Croatian Royal Council - newly installed in town - gave order to the Varaždin town authorities to uphold restriction on drying flax and hemp fiber on house stoves, on smoking around barns and stables, and on replacing wooden chimneys by brick-built ones, the latter an expensive task: 1768 records show that that concerned most of Varaždin's chimneys, a fire hazard compounded by that the people hardly ever cleaned them. In 1755, Varaždin had only one chimneysweeper, not even paid on a regular basis. The presence of the country's gouvernment in town somewhat changed the attitude towards fire. For example, upon another fire in 1769, there were records of efficiency in putting out the fire. Members of the town's administration showing up at fire sight were to take charge of the operation, duties were assigned to firefighters and their performance monitored.

A record from 1771 mentions 32 buildings and many stables and barns destroyed by fire. That year, the Hungarian Chamber representative proposed to the town authorities to help those who lost homes in fire rebuild in bricks and setting up stoves outside their houses - not only in Varaždin town center, but also further in the town outskirts. Thus in 1774, the Hungarian chamber demanded from Varaždin town authorities that burned-down homes of Sračinec village be replaced with raw brick buildings. Moreover, in 1767 the town owned only one water-sprinkling device with a two- to three bucket capacity; in 1772 Queen Maria Theresa issued an ordnance listing necessary equipment that the town's authorities had to purchase for fire-fighting, (Note: The fire equipment that Queen Maria Theresa ordered the town to equip itself with in 1772, comprised 6 large buckets, 2 large sprinklers and 12 hand-held ones, 40 leather bags for carrying water, 12 ladders and 12 two-hook clamps. (Petrić 2008, p. 126)) and by 1773, the town owned most of this equipment. In 1771, Varaždin authorities made fire-fighting compulsory for all citizens.

But this did not spare the town from its next big fire, that of 25–26 April 1776. It started in the Sračinec suburb (west of Varaždin) and, again due to strong wind - and the carelessness of a merchant who had stashed gunpowder in his house, which exploded and added fuel to the fire -, spread to Varaždin. Of the 113 buildings held within its walls, 70 were entirely destroyed and 11 partially destroyed; the northern suburb had held 256 buildings, of which 111 were entirely destroyed; and of the 245 homes in the southern suburb, 135 were destroyed : altogether, from the total of 614 homes, 316 were destroyed - more than half. Most of the nobility fled the town, and with it the country's government so recently installed there. But the commoners (primarily merchants and artisans) remained - and turned their town into one huge building site: by 1780 the number of homes equaled that prior to the fire.
After that fire, the town authorities decreed a public prohibition of wooden houses inside the town walls; even more specifically, brickmade chimneys became compulsory. The authorities ensured that adequate building materials were available. A committee was set up to inspect all chimneys and list down those which were fire hazards. Incentives were set up too, rewarding those citizens who were first to help in fire fighting; in the 18th century, there were public citations for citizens who showed up at fires with fire-fighting sprinkling equipment, as well as those who arrived on site with large amounts of water to put out fire. Later, fire insurance policies were set up with insurance companies.

In spite of all those set-backs, the 17th and 18th centuries saw Varaždin's economy and culture expand; within that period it grew from around 3,000 inhabitants around the year 1600 to around 5,500 inhabitants by the end of the 18th century.

Capital of Croatia

In 1756 or 1766, the Ban Ferenc Nádasdy chose Varaždin as his official residence, and Varaždin became the capital of all of Croatia. It hosted the Croatian Sabor and the Royal Croatian Council founded by Empress Maria Theresa.

The April 1776 fire put an end to that presence in town.

Post-capital

The periods of the Reformation and the Counter-Reformation had a great influence on Varaždin. With the arrival of the Jesuits, the school (gymnasium) and the Jesuit house were founded, and churches and other buildings were built in the Baroque style. In the 18th century Varaždin was the seat of many Croatian noblemen, and in 1756 it became the Croatian administrative centre. The fire of 1776 destroyed some 80% of the town, resulting in the administrative institutions moving back to Zagreb.

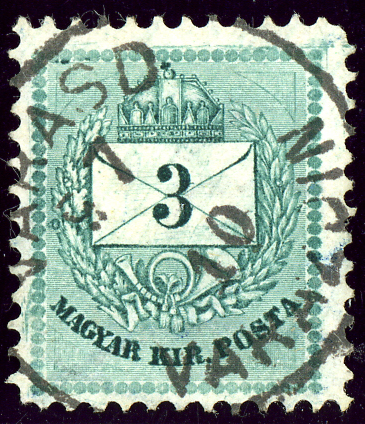
Varasd and Varaždin on a 3 kr Hungarian stamp 1881 issue

=== 19th century ===
Varaždin was the seat of Varaždin County of the Kingdom of Croatia-Slavonia within the Austro-Hungarian monarchy, ruled by the Kingdom of Hungary after the compromise of 1867. The Hungarian stamp, issued in 1881 shows both names.

By the 19th century Varaždin had been completely rebuilt and expanded, with flourishing crafts and trade, and later the manufacture of silk and bricks. The theatre and the music school were founded. From the second half of 19th century, fire fighting was organized and specialized fire-fighting societies were established; the very first fire fighting volunteers in Croato-Slavonnian Kingdom was organized in Varaždin in 1864.

=== 20th century ===
In the 20th century Varaždin developed into the industrial centre of northwestern Croatia. The textile manufacturer Tivar was founded in 1918. A silk factory was started in 1929, the one which would later start the sportswear brand YASSA.

The DVD "Varteks" was founded in 1935. It was Varaždin's main fire department until the foundation of DVD "Zdravstvo" on 21 December 1981.

Under the leadership of professor Krešimir Filić, the town developed a city library, a city museum, a gallery, reopened its music school, and had a mountaineering society started.

Soon after the start of World War II in Yugoslavia, on 12 July 1941, Varaždin was declared Judenfrei by the Ustaše, becoming the first city in Croatia to earn this dubious distinction.

The 12-story tall Vodotoranj, the tallest building in Varaždin.

The former village of Biškupec, whose population was tracked as a separate settlement between 1857 and 1948, when it reached 635 inhabitants, was integrated into the city of Varaždin since the 1953 census.

The tallest building in Varaždin, the Vodotoranj, was constructed in 1965 originally having a typical mid-century design. It was renovated in the year of 2020 to achieve the modern look

In the Croatian War of Independence, 1991, Varaždin suffered directly for only for a few days, because the huge Yugoslav People's Army base quickly surrendered after the Siege of Varaždin Barracks, resulting in a minimal number of casualties, and providing weapons (worth $600m) for the Croatian army.

== Monuments and sights ==
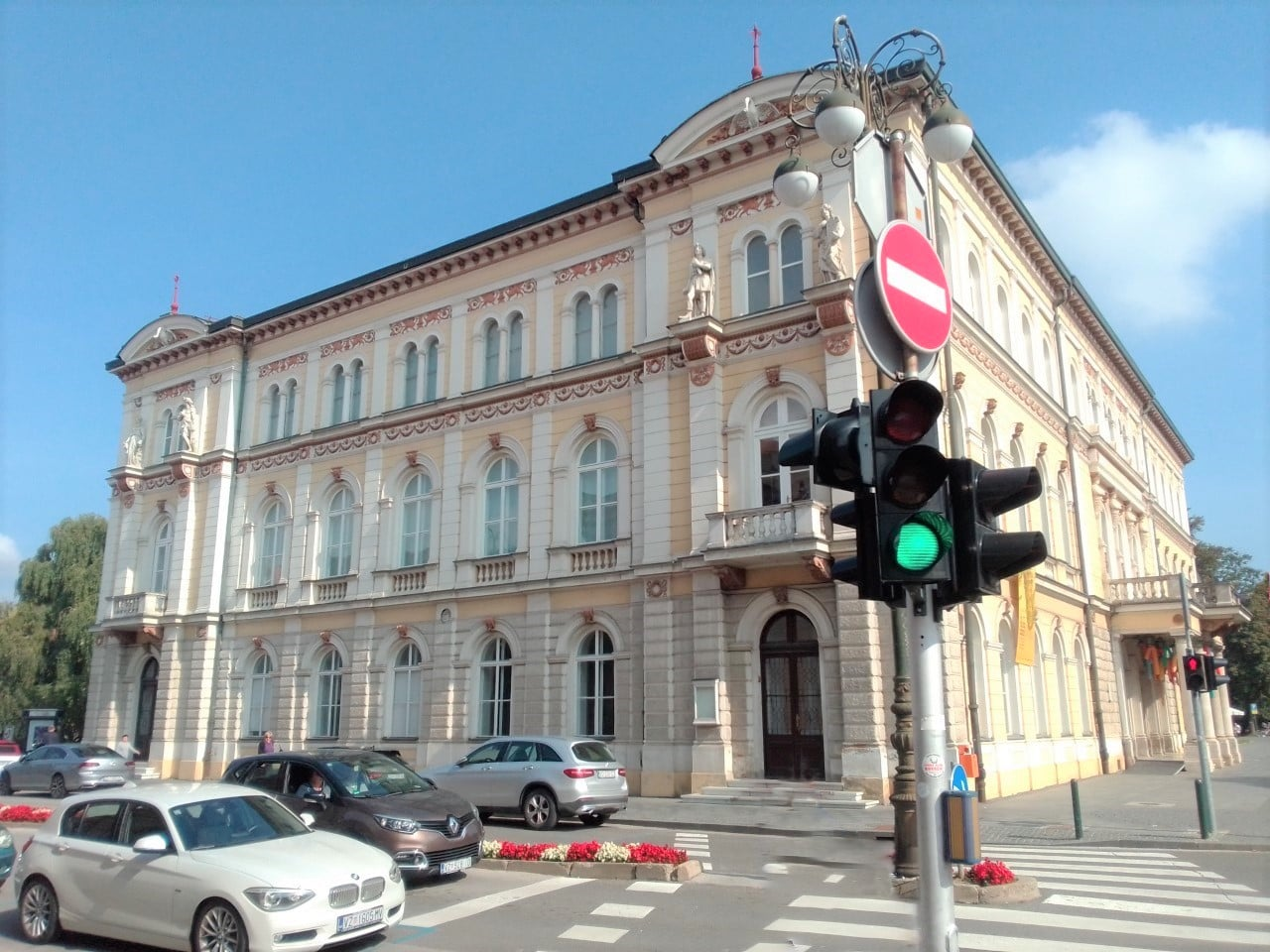
Croatian National Theatre in Varaždin

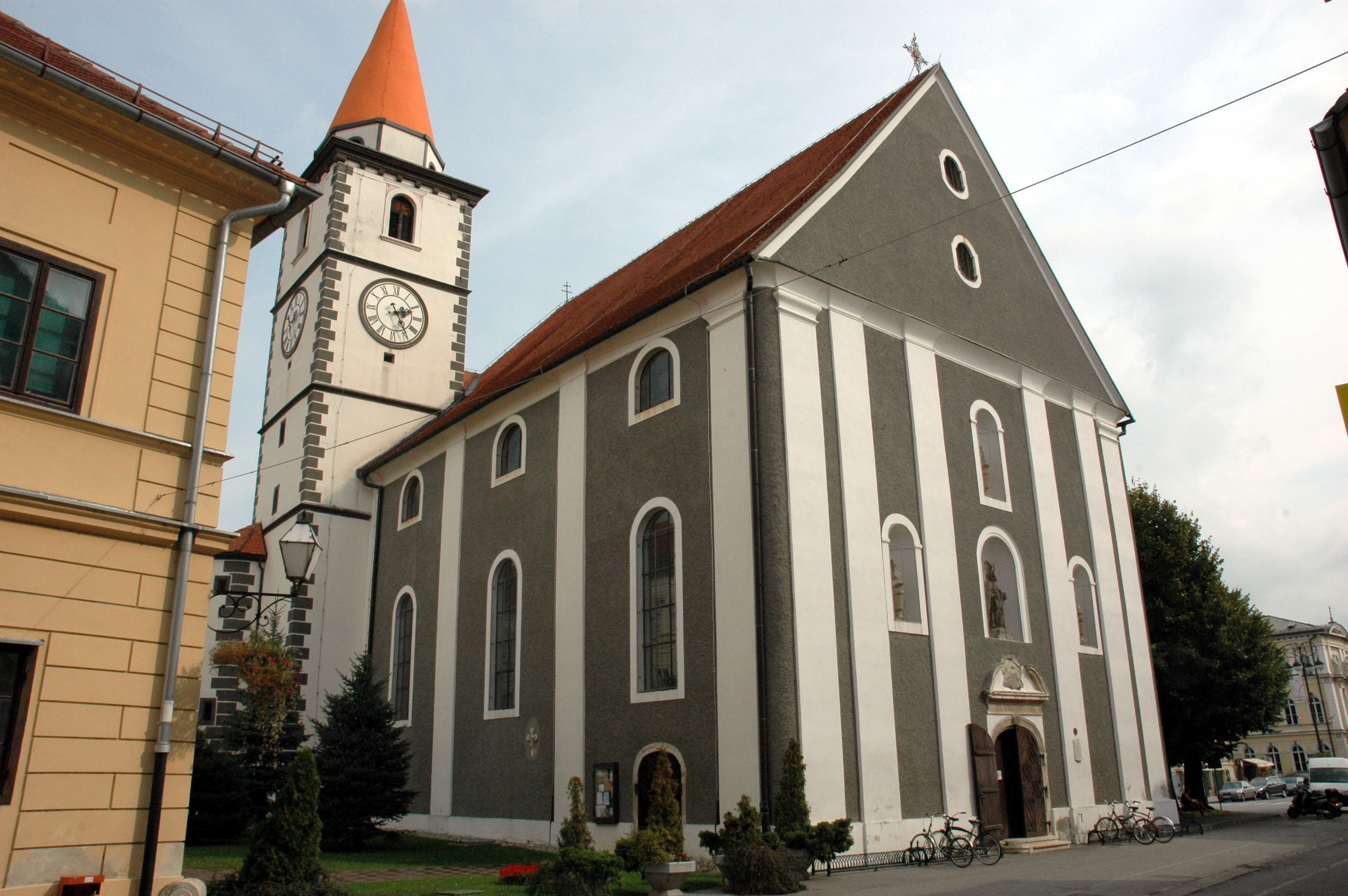
Church of Saint Nicholas.

Varaždin represents the best preserved and richest urban complex in continental Croatia. It aims for a Unesco listing as a World Heritage Site.

The Old Town (fortress) is an example of medieval defensive buildings. Construction began in the 14th century, and in the following century the rounded towers, typical of Gothic architecture in Croatia, were added. Today it houses the Town Museum. The fortress was depicted on the reverse of the Croatian 5 kuna banknote, issued in 1993 and 2001.

The Old and Contemporary Masters Gallery is located in the Sermage Palace, built in the rococo style in 1750.

In 1523, Margrave Georg of Brandenburg built the town hall in late baroque style, with the Varaždin coat of arms at the foot of the tower, and it has continued in its function until the present day. There is a guard-changing ceremony every Saturday.

Varaždin's Cathedral, a former Jesuit church, was built in 1647, and is distinguished by its baroque entrance, eighteenth-century altar, and paintings.

There are many baroque and rococo palaces and houses in the town. Worth particular mention is Varaždin's Croatian National Theatre, built in 1873 and designed by the Viennese architects Herman Helmer and Ferdinand Fellner.

A baroque music festival has been held annually in Varaždin since 1971, and attracts some of the finest musicians and their fans from Croatia and the world. Recommended to visitors is also the historical street festival Špancir fest every August.

The city features its old city guard, named Purgari, in various city ceremonies as well as the weekly ceremony of the 'change of the guards' in front of the city hall. Additionally, Varaždin police officers patrol on bicycles in the warmer months.

=== The Old Town (Stari Grad) ===
The Old Town keep is one of the biggest monuments in the city of Varaždin and one of its biggest tourist attractions. It is located in the north-western section of the city core. Today the keep houses the Varaždin City Museum.

The keep is first mentioned in the 12th century and it is believed to be the center of Varaždin county life. The keep underwent numerous ownership changes and reconstructions over the centuries. The Old Town was featured on the now defunct 5 Kuna bill.

=== Churches and monasteries ===
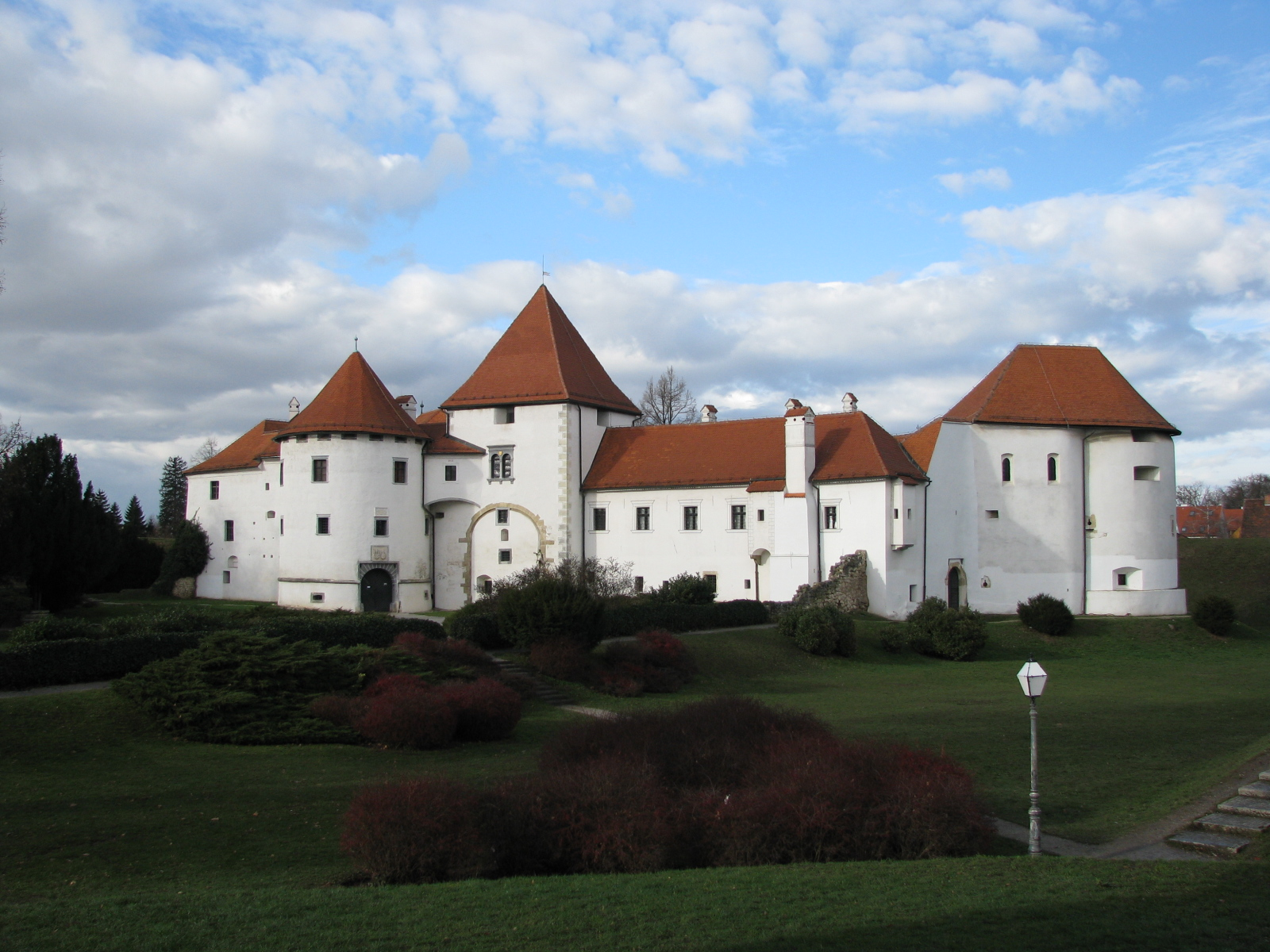
Varaždin Castle in the Old Town.

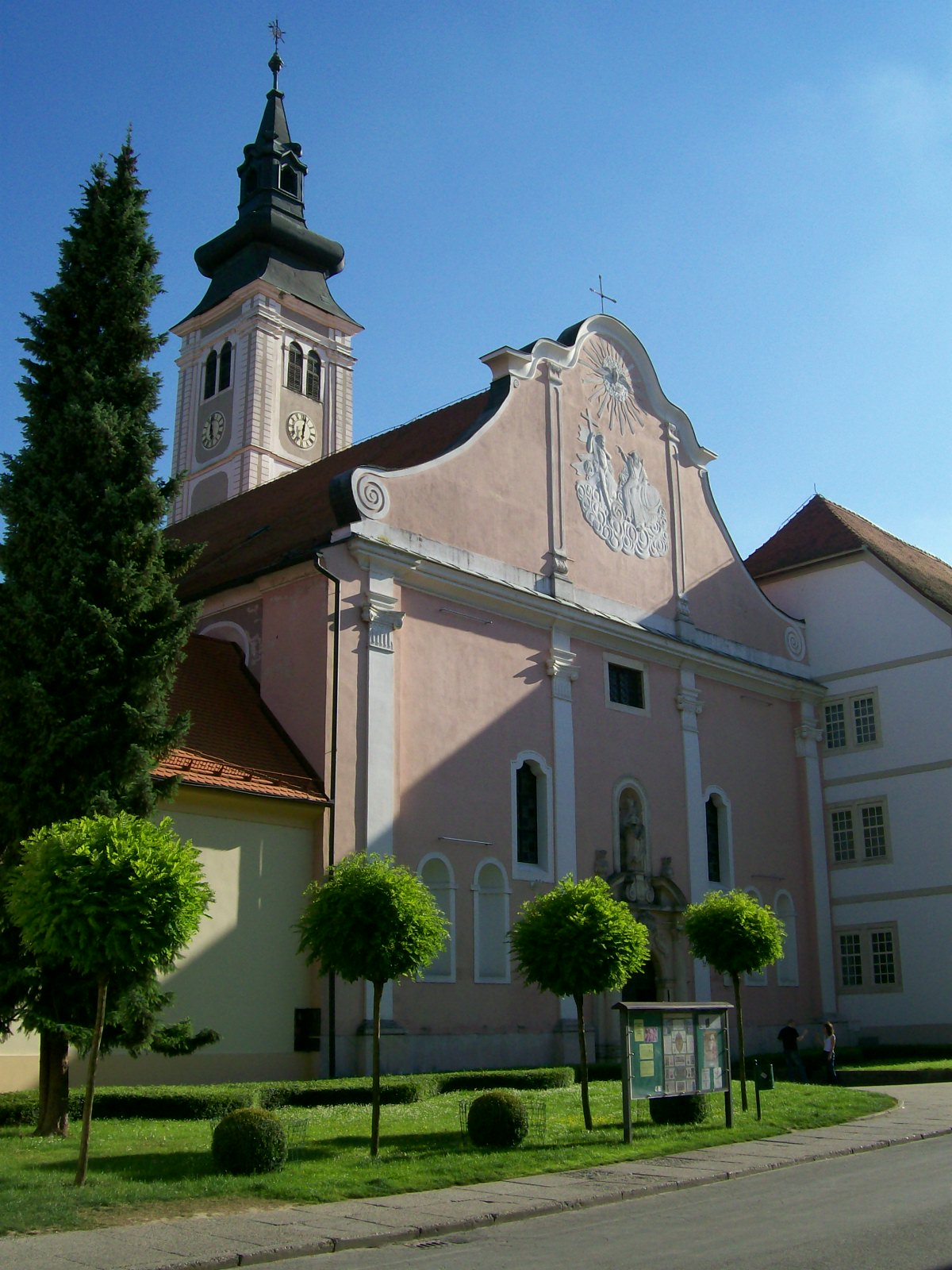
Varaždin's Cathedral.

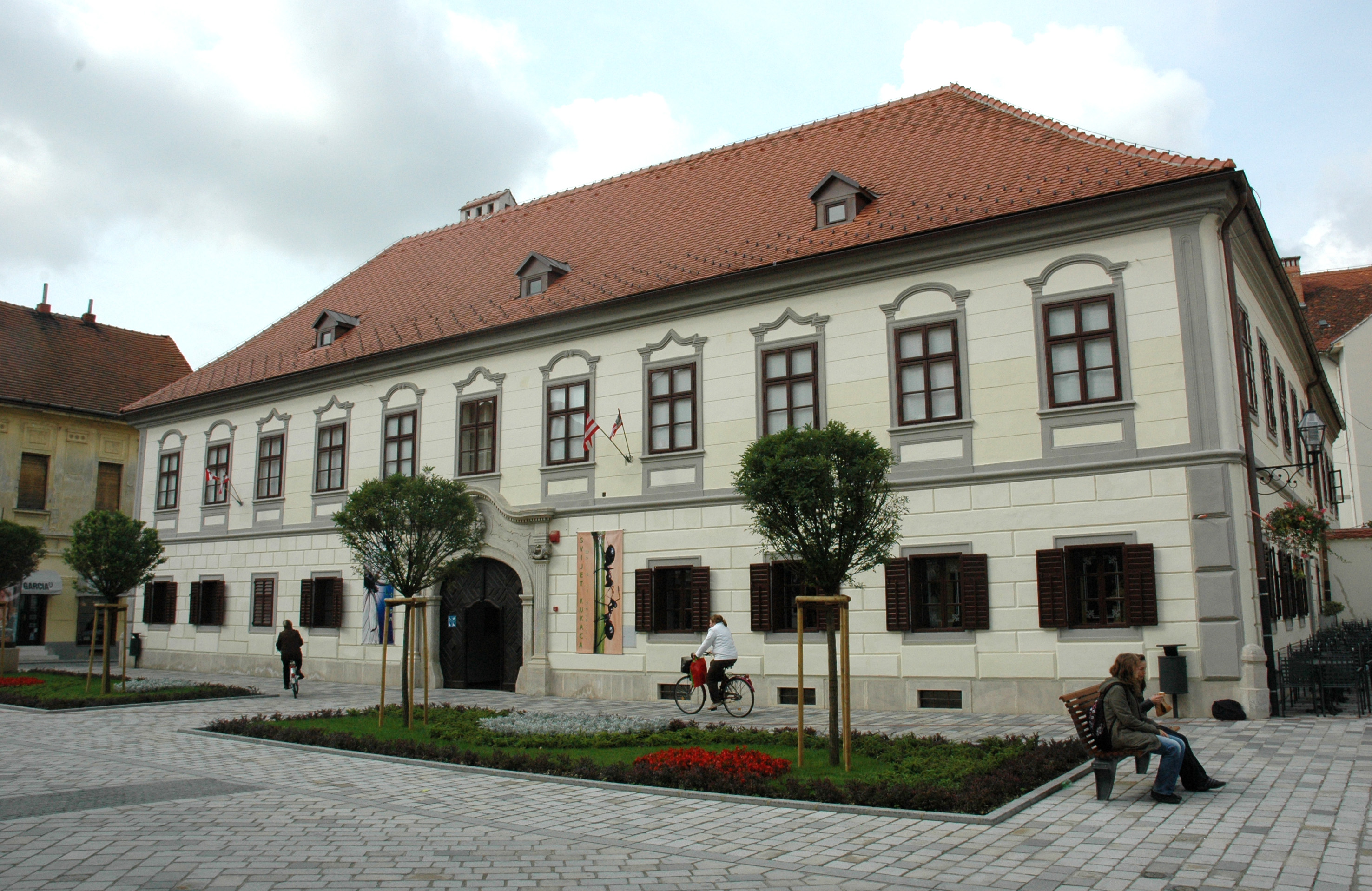
Herzer Palace.

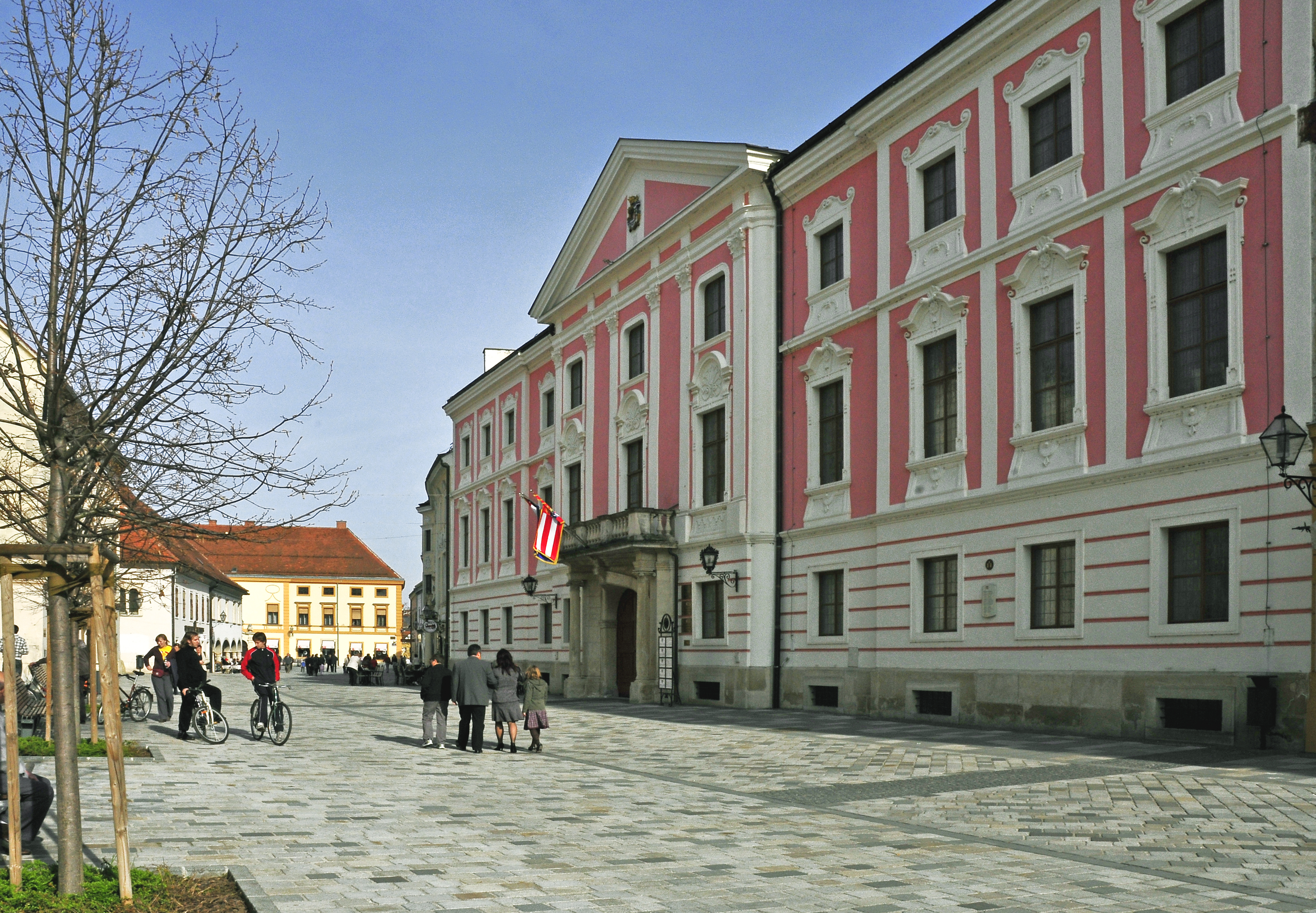
County Palace. Varazdin.

- Parish Church of St. Nicholas
- Jesuit College and the Church of St. Mary, today the Cathedral
- Franciscan Friary and the Church of St. John the Baptist
- Ursuline Convent and the Church of the Nativity
- Capuchin Monastery and the Church of the Holy Trinity

- Chapel of St. Florian
- Chapel of St. Vitus
- Chapel of St. Fabian and Sebastian
- Chapel of St. Rochus
- Orthodox Church of St George

=== Baroque palaces ===
- Town Hall
- Bužan Palace
- Drašković Palace
- Eggersdorfer Palace
- Erdődy Palace
- Erdődy-Oršić Palace
- Herzer Palace
- Hinterholzer Palace
- Janković Palace

- Keglević Palace
- Palace of Varaždin County
- Palace of the Zagreb Kaptol
- Patačić Palace
- Patačić-Puttar Palace
- Petković Palace
- Prašinski-Sermage Palace
- Pauline Mansion

=== Varaždin cemetery ===
The cemetery dates back to 1773 and it was long time an ordinary place until 1905, when Herman Haller had an idea to make it more park-like with large trees and alleys for citizens to stroll through. The reconstruction of the cemetery was done between 1905 and 1947, and its current landscape and architecture dates from these works, It is now a protected cultural and natural park.

=== Festivals ===
- Špancirfest
- Varaždin Baroque Evenings
- International Children and Youth Animation Film Festival VAFI, since 2010

In 2023 Varaždin is the first croatian city to become a UNESCO Creative City in the field of music.

=== Museums ===
- THE OLD TOWN (STARI GRAD) Museum houses the Cultural and Historic Collection. The Old Town Museum has been a part of the Varaždin City Museum organization since 1925. Today is features: over 400 pieces from the glass, ceramics and clocks collection, 10 rooms furnished in chronological period style (renaissance, baroque, rococo, Empire, Biedermeier, historicism and art deco), a chapel and sacristy, and 2 rooms dedicated to two prominent men from Varaždin, Vatroslav Jagić and Ivan Kukuljević Sakcinski.
- THE HERZER PALACE houses the Entomological Collection focusing on The World of Insects. There are over 4500 exhibits which clearly show the biology of bugs through several topics:In the forest, Near the forest and on the meadow, In the water and near the water, At night and underground.
- THE SERMAGE PALACE houses the Gallery of Old and Contemporary Masters Art Gallery. It is home to over 5300 works of art separated in 10 collections with works ranging from the 15th to the 20th century.

== Geography ==
The total area is 59.45 km^{2} (22.95 sq mi) (2001). The urban city settlement is 34.22 km^{2} (13.21 sq mi).

The centre of Varaždin County is located near the Drava River, at 46.312°N 16.361°E.

=== Climate ===
Varaždin has a warm-summer humid continental climate (Köppen climate classification Dfb) bordering on a maritime climate (Cfb).

Since records began in 1949, the highest temperature recorded at the local weather station at an elevation of 157 metres (515 ft) was 39.4 °C (102.9 °F), on 8 August 2013. The coldest temperature was −28.0 °C (−18.4 °F), on 16 February 1956.

Climate data for Varaždin (1971–2000 normals, 1949–2014 extremes)
Month	Jan	Feb	Mar	Apr	May	Jun	Jul	Aug	Sep	Oct	Nov	Dec	Year
Record high °C (°F)	19.3 (66.7)	21.6 (70.9)	25.3 (77.5)	30.4 (86.7)	33.2 (91.8)	36.0 (96.8)	39.3 (102.7)	39.4 (102.9)	32.9 (91.2)	27.7 (81.9)	24.3 (75.7)	21.4 (70.5)	39.4 (102.9)
Mean daily maximum °C (°F)	3.4 (38.1)	6.1 (43.0)	11.1 (52.0)	15.7 (60.3)	20.9 (69.6)	23.9 (75.0)	26.0 (78.8)	25.8 (78.4)	21.5 (70.7)	15.5 (59.9)	8.6 (47.5)	4.4 (39.9)	15.2 (59.4)
Daily mean °C (°F)	−0.2 (31.6)	1.6 (34.9)	5.8 (42.4)	10.3 (50.5)	15.4 (59.7)	18.5 (65.3)	20.2 (68.4)	19.5 (67.1)	15.4 (59.7)	10.0 (50.0)	4.6 (40.3)	1.0 (33.8)	10.2 (50.4)
Mean daily minimum °C (°F)	−3.7 (25.3)	−2.5 (27.5)	1.0 (33.8)	4.7 (40.5)	9.2 (48.6)	12.6 (54.7)	14.1 (57.4)	13.5 (56.3)	10.0 (50.0)	5.5 (41.9)	1.0 (33.8)	−2.2 (28.0)	5.3 (41.5)
Record low °C (°F)	−26.8 (−16.2)	−28 (−18)	−23.4 (−10.1)	−5.5 (22.1)	−2.3 (27.9)	2.2 (36.0)	4.7 (40.5)	3.2 (37.8)	−3.1 (26.4)	−7.5 (18.5)	−19.6 (−3.3)	−22.7 (−8.9)	−28 (−18)
Average precipitation mm (inches)	38.9 (1.53)	42.0 (1.65)	50.9 (2.00)	63.1 (2.48)	71.8 (2.83)	96.5 (3.80)	91.2 (3.59)	88.0 (3.46)	84.7 (3.33)	80.6 (3.17)	77.0 (3.03)	58.3 (2.30)	843.1 (33.19)
Average precipitation days (≥ 0.1 mm)	9.2	9.3	10.9	12.9	13.2	14.0	12.1	10.9	10.3	10.4	11.1	11.2	135.4
Average snowy days (≥ 1.0 cm)	13.5	9.9	3.4	0.5	0.0	0.0	0.0	0.0	0.0	0.0	3.7	9.4	40.4
Average relative humidity (%)	84.1	78.6	73.2	69.1	69.6	70.9	71.7	74.8	79.3	81.7	84.7	85.7	76.9
Mean monthly sunshine hours	77.5	113.0	148.8	180.0	238.7	246.0	279.0	260.4	195.0	139.5	84.0	65.1	2,027
Percentage possible sunshine	30	43	45	49	57	59	65	65	57	47	34	29	51
Source: Croatian Meteorological and Hydrological Service

== Economy and tourism ==
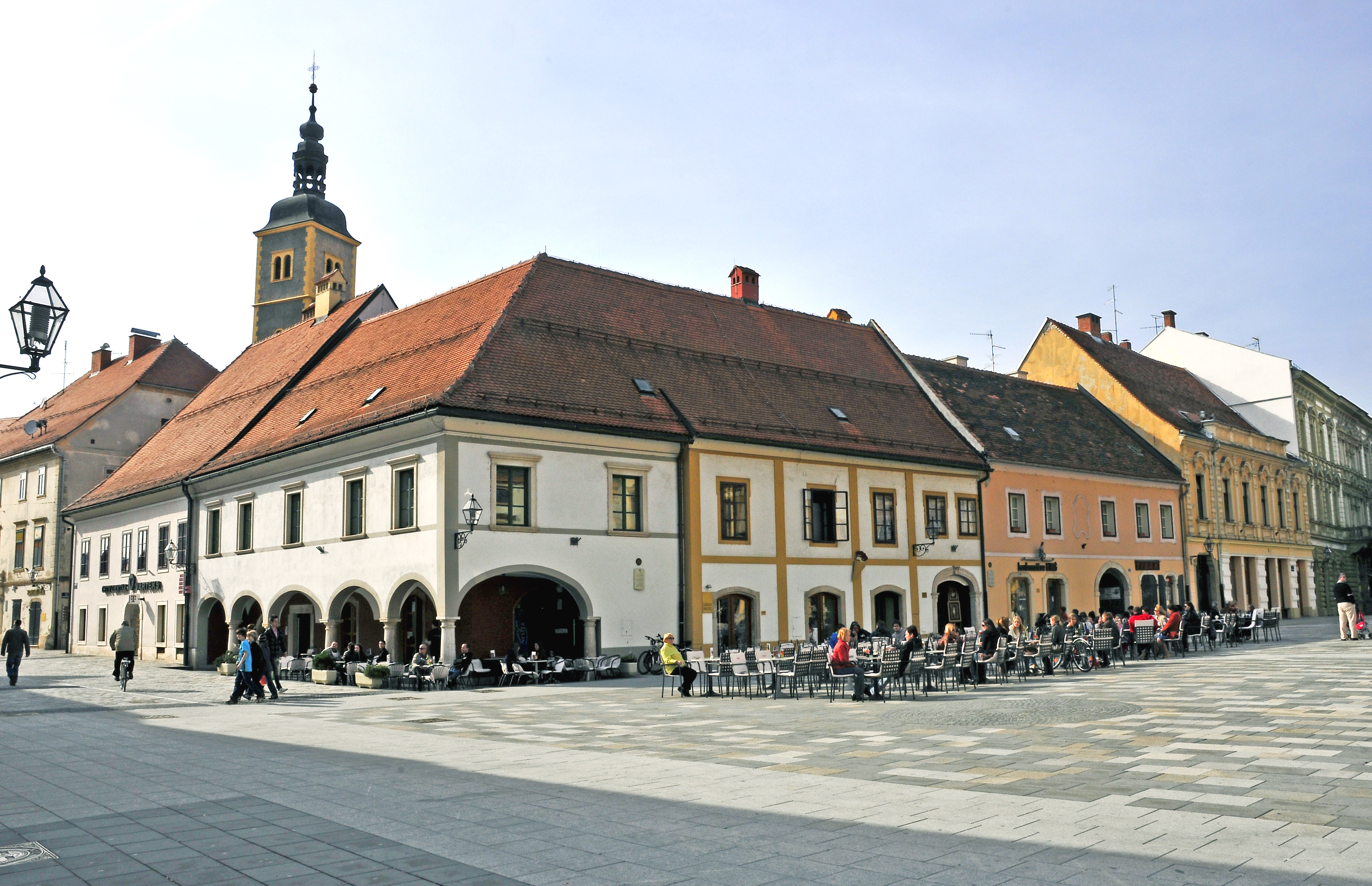
Streets of Varaždin.

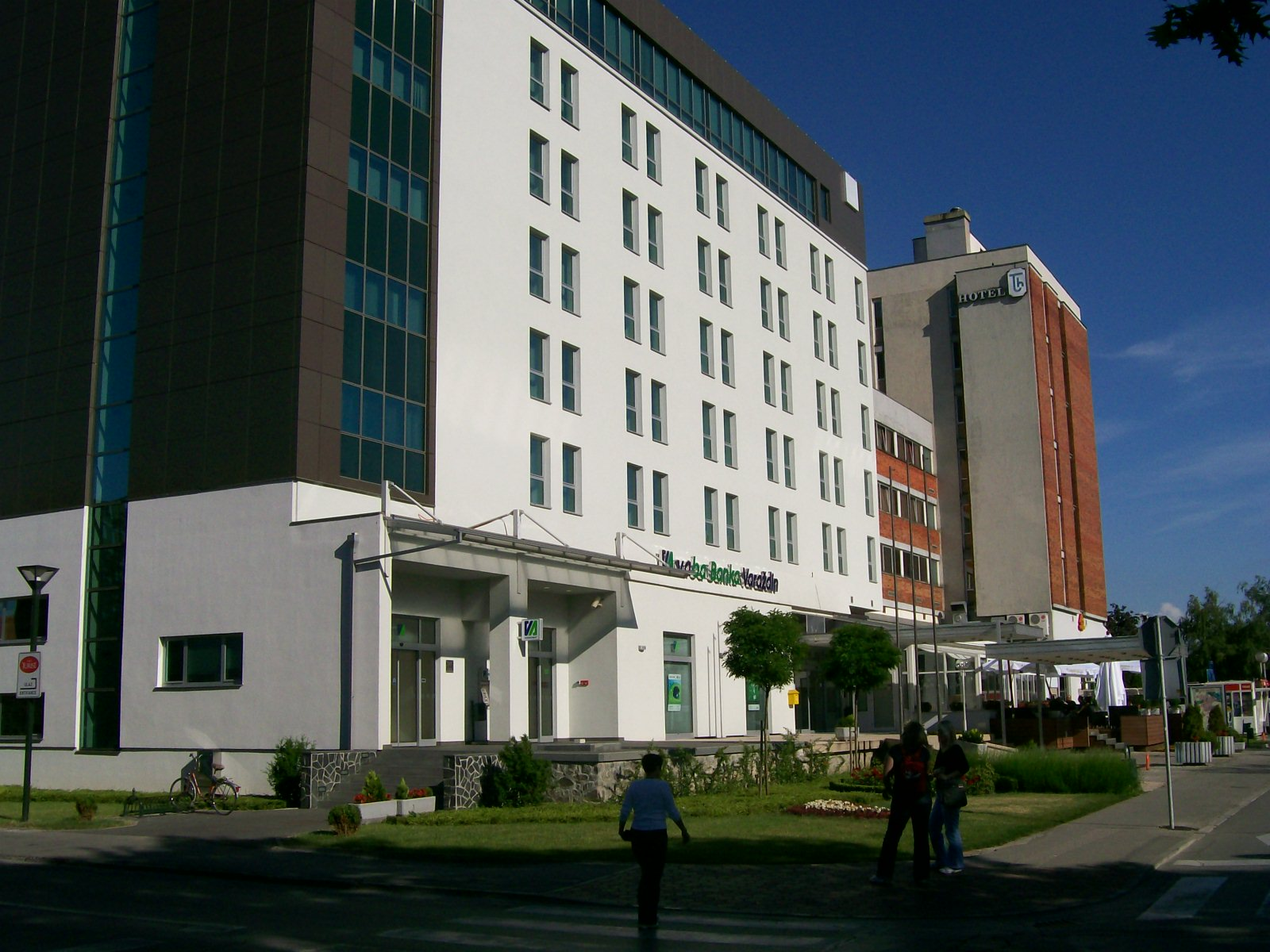
Hotel Turist.

Varaždin is one of the few Croatian cities whose industry did not directly suffer from the war in 1991. Besides textile giant Varteks (Varaždin Textile), it also has nationally important food (Vindija), metal, and construction industries. The Information Technology and financial and banking sector as are well developed. Further economic development has been encouraged with the creation of a free investment zone.

Today Varaždin is a tourist destination for the summer holidays. The city has numerous areas of interests ranging from cultural areas (reflected by many museums, galleries and theaters in the area), shopping centers in the downtown core, various sports and recreation facilities, also a rich history in cuisine. The close of the tourist season is marked by two annual festivals. The annual ŠpancirFest begins at the end of August and ends in September (lasts for 10 days). At this time the city welcomes artists, street performers, musicians and vendors for what is called "the street walking festival".

The city also hosts the Varaždin Baroque Evenings festival, first held in 1971. The festival honours baroque music and culture, both of which hold a special place in Varaždin's identity.

Varaždin was also the host of the Radar Festival, which hosted concerts at the end of summer. It has hosted artists like Bob Dylan, Carlos Santana, The Animals, Manic Street Preachers, Solomon Burke and others.

=== Geothermal potential ===
In October 2023, the state-owned energy company, Bukotermal, announced the discovery of an underground lake of superheated water at an average 142 °C (288 °F), with the potential to support a 16MW geothermal power plant near the towns of Lunjkovec and Kutnjak.

== Transportation ==
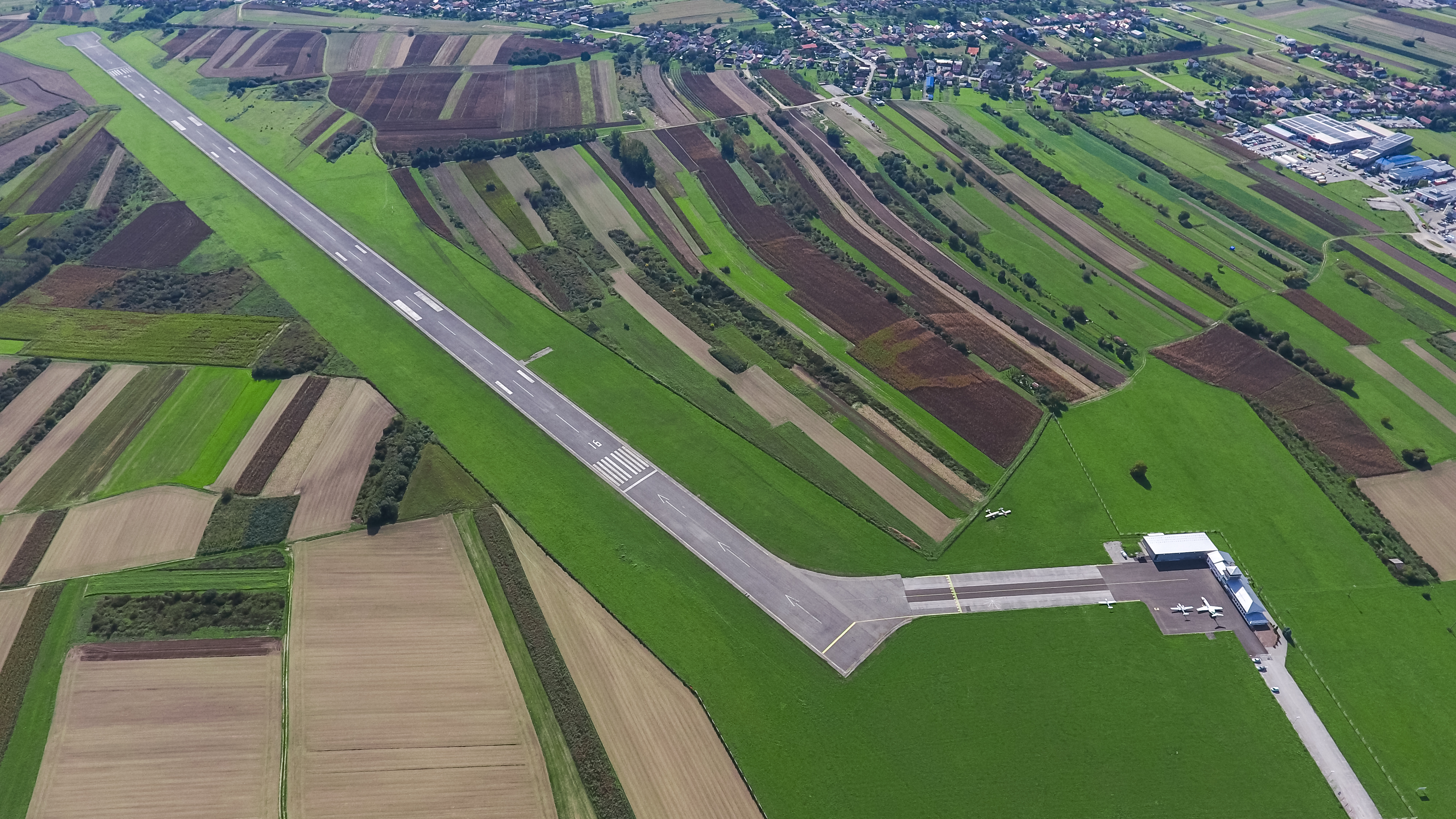
Varaždin Aerodrome

Apart from A4 highway that runs between Zagreb and Goričan (Hungarian border), there are three state roads that reach the area of Varaždin: D2, D3 and D35. The town is fully encircled by the Varaždin bypass. Varaždin is also a hub for bus transportation company "AP Varaždin" which offers significant number of county (local), inter-county and inter-city services, also offering international lines.

Varaždin's railway station is one of the largest and most important train stations in northern Croatia. It represents the intersection of three Croatian railway corridors that are used for both passenger and freight traffic - it lies on R201 railway (Zaprešić - Čakovec) and also represents the terminus for one local line (L201 connecting Golubovec) and one regional line (R202 connecting Dalj via Koprivnica, Virovitica and Osijek). All of the rail corridors that start, end or pass through Varaždin are single-tracked and non-electrified.

The city is further served by Varaždin Aerodrome, ICAO code LDVA. As of 2026, it has no scheduled airline service, but handles recreational and business flights. Its IATA code QRD appears to have been withdrawn.

== Sport ==
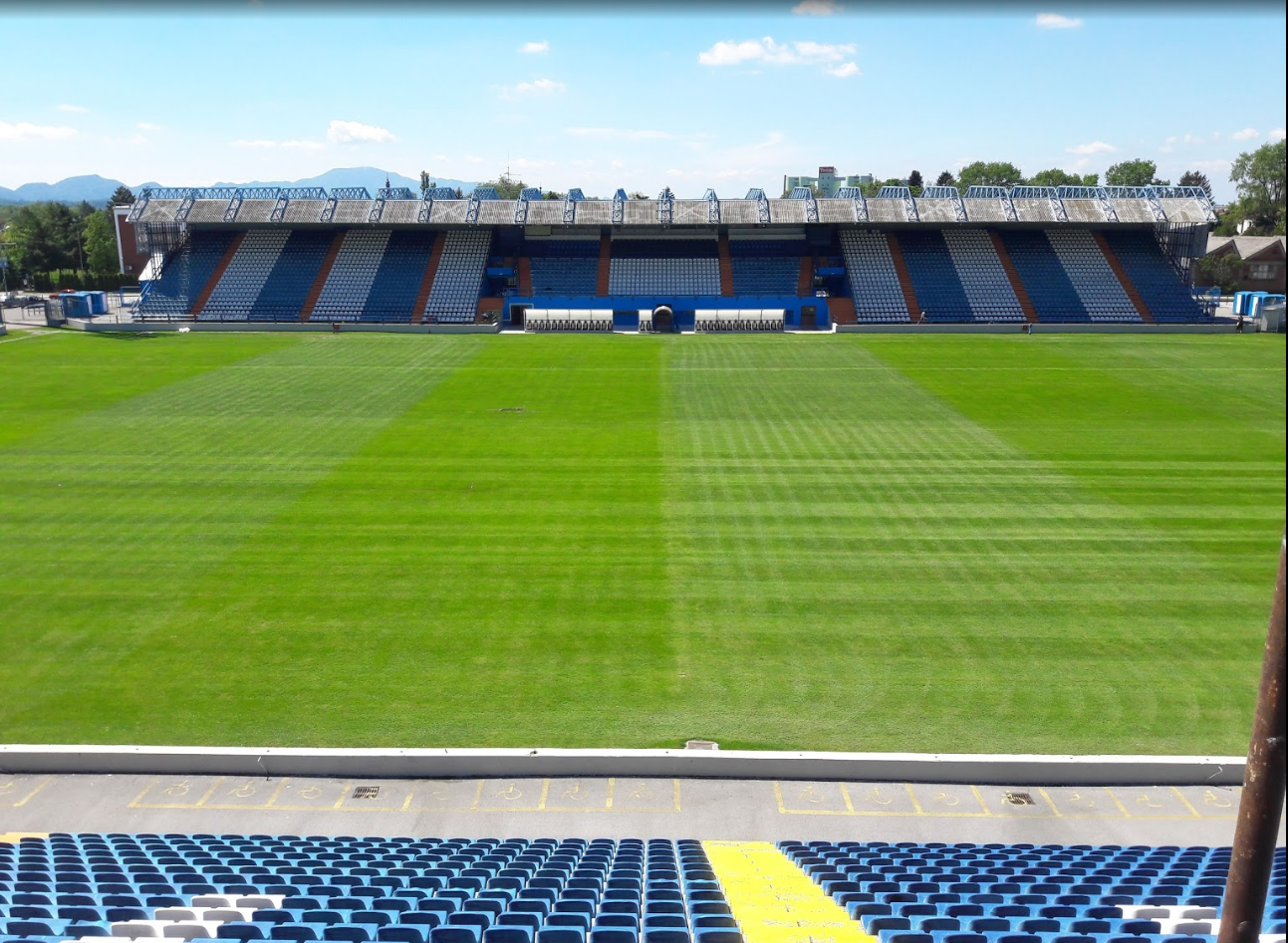
Stadion Varteks

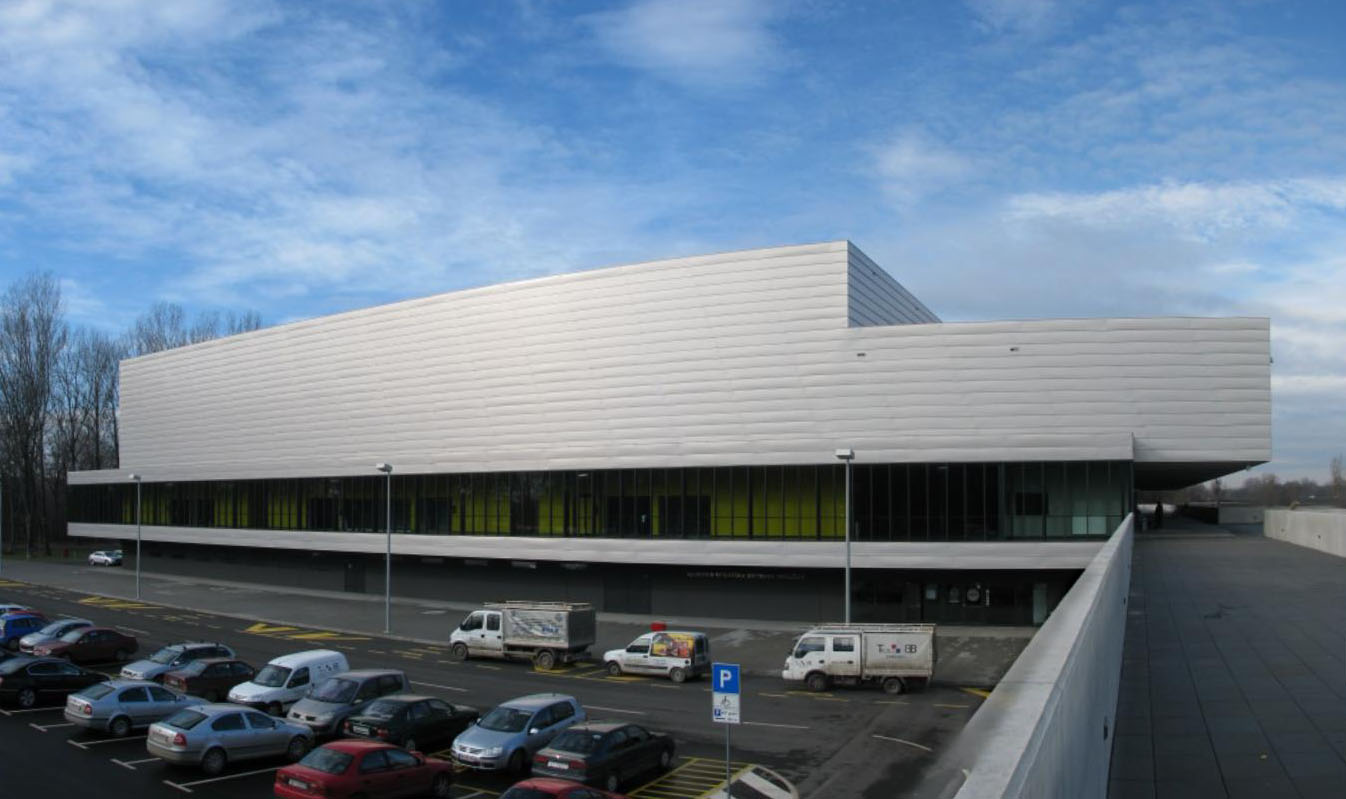
Varaždin Arena, a multipurpose sport center built for the 2009 World Men's Handball Championship.

Varaždin is home to a number of professional and semi-professional sports clubs. Varaždin Arena, located near the Drava River, was one of the hosts of the 2009 World Men's Handball Championship held in Croatia, as well as one of the hosts of the 2025 World Men's Handball Championship held in Croatia, Denmark and Norway.

- Football: NK Varaždin (1931–2015), NK Varteks (2011), NK Varaždin (2012)
- Handball: RK Varteks Di Caprio, RK Koka
- Basketball: KK Varaždin, KK Varteks
- Volleyball: OK Varaždin
- Tennis: TK Varaždin, TK Varteks
- Baseball BK Vindija Varaždin
- Ice hockey: "KHL Varaždin"
- Wrestling: "Vindija"
- Water polo: "Coning"
- Badminton: "BK KAJ"
- Bicycling: "BD Sloga"
- Track and field: "TK Marathon 95", "AK Sloboda Varaždin"
- Mountaineering: "Ravna Gora"

In mountaineering, the local chapter of the HPS is HPD "Ravna Gora", which had 175 members in 1936 under the Krešimir Filić presidency. At the time, it had a ski and a photography section. Membership fell to 138 in 1937, and to 136 in 1938.

== Education ==
=== Schools ===
Varaždin has seven elementary schools, 10 high schools (2 public gymnasiums, 2 private gymnasiums, trade schools, and other specialized high schools for various paths). Varaždin 2 faculties (Faculty of Organization and Information Technology and Geotechnical faculty) that are part of the University of Zagreb and the University North.

=== Universities ===
There are 2 public universities currently operating in the city of Varaždin: Varaždin and Koprivnica took part in establishing the University North, a public national university that operates in both cities since 2015. University of Zagreb is present in the city with 2 displaced faculties from Zagreb itself.

== Culture ==
The folk tradition of Christening the Bridge (Croatian: krštenje mosta) exists in Varaždin and some surrounding towns.

== Notable people ==
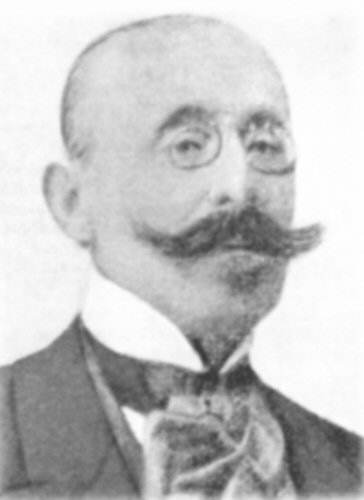
Ksaver Šandor Gjalski.

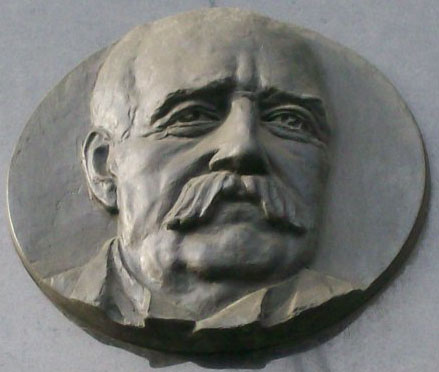
Vjekoslav Klaić.

This list contains some of the notable people who were either born in Varaždin, lived in the city for a longer time or were in some significant way related to it.

- Ivan Belostenec – linguist, lexicographer
- Zvonko Bezjak – hammer thrower
- Slavko Brankov – actor
- Mirko Breyer – writer, bibliographer and antiquarian
- Zlatko Dalić – football manager in charge of the Croatia national team
- Baltazar Dvorničić Napuly – Catholic cleric and lawyer
- Kristijan Đurasek – cyclist
- Krešimir Filić (1891–1972), historian and museologist
- Ignaz Grossmann (1825–1897), rabbi
- Juraj Habdelić – writer
- Robert Herjavec – businessman, investor, and television personality
- Hermann II of Celje – count
- Saša Hiršzon (born 1972) - tennis player
- Branko Ivanković – football manager
- Luka Ivanušec – footballer
- Vatroslav Jagić – philologist, linguist
- Marija Jurić Zagorka – journalist, dramatist and novelist
- Ljubomir Kerekeš – actor
- Vjekoslav Klaić – writer and historian
- Jana Koščak – athlete
- Ferdinand Konščak – explorer, cartographer
- Željko Krajan – tennis coach and former player
- Ivan Kukuljević Sakcinski – historian, politician, writer
- Maria Leitner - writer, journalist
- Samuel Louis Mosinger – businessman and member of the "Varaždin charity society"
- Miljenko Mumlek – footballer
- Robert Murić – footballer
- Ivan Padovec – guitar virtuoso
- Franjo Rački – historian, politician and writer
- Marko Rog – footballer
- Radoslav Rogina – cyclist
- Vjekoslav Rosenberg-Ružić – composer, conductor and music educator
- Silvester Sabolčki – footballer
- Tadija Smičiklas – historian and politician
- Ignacije Szentmartony – theologian
- Ksaver Šandor Gjalski – writer and civil servant
- Karolina Šprem – tennis player
- Krsto Ungnad – baron/mayor
- Željko Vincek – track and field athlete
- Davor Vugrinec – footballer
- Johann Baptist Wanhal – composer

== Twin towns – sister cities ==
Varaždin is twinned with:

- Bad Radkersburg, Austria
- Koblenz, Germany
- Montale, Italy
- Ptuj, Slovenia
- Ravensburg, Germany
- Schaffhausen, Switzerland
- Trnava, Slovakia
- Zalaegerszeg, Hungary

== See also ==
- Roman Catholic Diocese of Varaždin
- Tentative list of World Heritage Sites in Croatia
- Varaždin County (former)

== Notes and references ==
Notes

== Sources ==
- Cresswell, Peterjon; Atkins, Ismay; Dunn, Lily (10 July 2006). Time Out Croatia (First ed.). London, Berkeley & Toronto: Time Out Group Ltd & Ebury Publishing, Random House Ltd. 20 Vauxhall Bridge Road, London SV1V 2SA. ISBN 978-1-904978-70-1.
- Goldstein, Ivo; Goldstein, Slavko (2001). Holokaust u Zagrebu (in Croatian). Zagreb, Croatia: Novi liber. p. 260. ISBN 978-9-53604-519-8.
- Huselja, Alma (7 August 2024). "Citizens and Thieves: "Aryanization" in Wartime Varaždin". Holocaust and Genocide Studies. 38 (2): 165–182. doi:10.1093/hgs/dcae025.
- Milčetić, Ivan (1919). "Kršteńe mošta (Grad Varaždin)" [Christening the Bridge (Varaždin City)]. Zbornik za narodni život i običaje Južnih Slavena (in Serbo-Croatian). 24. JAZU: 319–322.
- Petrić, Hrvoje; Poljak, Sonja (3 December 2012). "O historiografiji Varaždina u ranom novom vijeku (16. - 18. stoljeće)" [On the Historiography of Varaždin in the Early Modern Age (16th - 18th Centuries)]. Historia Varasdiensis: časopis za varaždinsku povjesnicu (in Serbo-Croatian). 2: 11–23. ISSN 1848-0837.
