= Samuel Louis Mosinger =

Croatian businessman (1804–1872)

- Born: 1804; Varaždin, Austrian Empire, (now Croatia)
- Died: 20 April 1872 (aged 68); Varaždin, Austro-Hungarian Empire

Samuel Louis Mosinger (1804 – 20 April 1872) was a prominent Croatian businessman, merchant and member of the "Varaždin charity society", the first and oldest such society in Croatia.

Mosinger was born in Varaždin to a Jewish family. He was a member of the presidency council and president of the Varaždin Jewish community since 1828. In 1844, Mosinger and Samuel Leitner were the first Jews who became members of the "Varaždin charity society", founded to help poor and needy citizens of Varaždin and surrounding areas. Mosinger was a well known supporter of the poor, and especially school youth regardless to religious affiliation. In 1865, because of his numerous and versatile merits for the "Varaždin charity society", he was knighted by Franz Joseph I of Austria. Mosinger was elected as the treasurer of the "Varaždin charity society" in 1851, and has been on that position until his death in 1872. He wrote "The short history of the Varaždin charity society" which is preserved at the Varaždin City Museum. Mosinger died in 1872 after a short and serious illness. "Agramer Zeitung" wrote with great sadness about his death, with a huge crowd attending the funeral.

== Books ==
- Mosinger, Samuel Louis (1863). Memoirs from Varaždin (in Croatian). Varaždin.
