= Kućan Marof =

Kučan Marof
- Village
- Location of Kučan Marof in Croatia
- Coordinates: 46°17′26″N 16°22′21″E
- Country: Croatia
- County: Varaždin County
- City: Varaždin

Area
  - Total: 2.4 km^{2} (0.93 sq mi)

Population (2021)
  - Total: 1,280
  - Density: 530/km^{2} (1,400/sq mi)
- Time zone: UTC+1 (CET)
  - Summer (DST): UTC+2 (CEST)
- Postal code: 42000 Varaždin
- Area code: +385 (0)42

Kućan Marof is a village in northern Croatia, located southeast of Varaždin. The population of the village in the 2011 census was 1,309.
