= Croatian National Theatre, Varaždin =

Croatian National Theatre in Varaždin
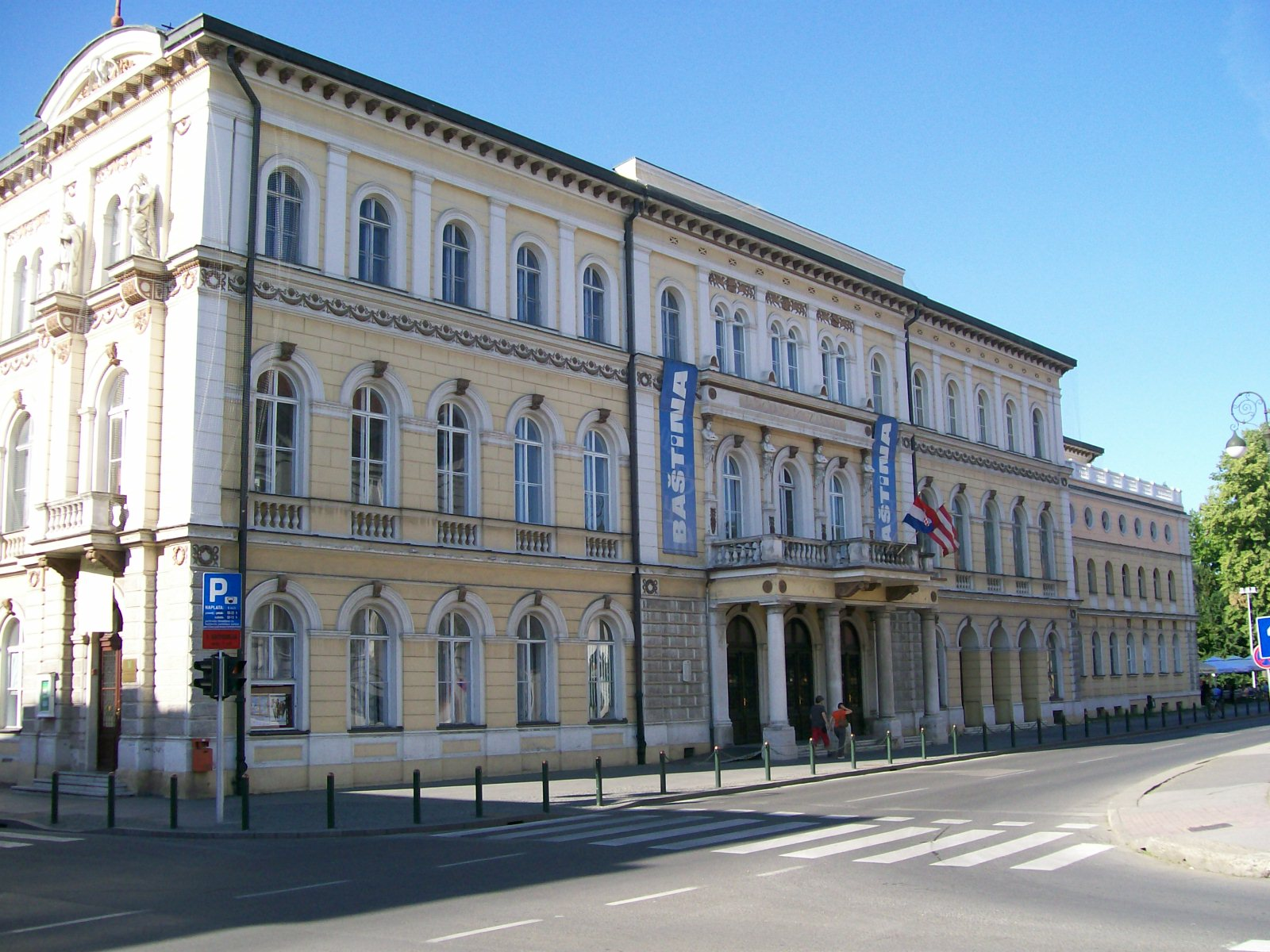
- Croatian National Theatre building in Varaždin
- Interactive map of Croatian National Theatre in Varaždin
- Address: Augusta Cesarca 1 Varaždin, Varaždin County; Croatia
- Coordinates: 46°18′20″N 16°20′14″E
- Type: national theatre

Construction
- Opened: 1873

Website
- www.hnkvz.hr

The Croatian National Theatre (Croatian: Hrvatsko narodno kazalište u Varaždinu), commonly referred to as HNK Varaždin, is a theatre located in Varaždin.

== History ==
The history of theater in Varaždin dates back to 1637, with the Jesuit school performances held at the local grammar school. These productions were predominantly in Latin and German language. Between 1788 and 1873, 30 theatrical performances were organized in Varaždin, taking place in both private and public spaces.

The theatre building, designed by Viennese architect Hermann Helmer, was completed in 1873. The theater in Varaždin was the third theatre building in Civil Croatia. The first professional Croatian theater ensemble was formed in 1898 under the management of the Croatian Drama Society, led by historian Ivan Mičetić. The Permanent City Theater as an institution was officially established in 1915, featuring both a drama and an opera ensemble. This institution was active until 1925. Between 1907 and 1942 Varaždin served as the secondary base for the Croatian National Theatre in Osijek. The city theatre was also used for marking special occasions of the city Gymnasium later in the interwar period. After World War II in Yugoslavia, the professional National Theater "August Cesarec" was established, with support from the Slavonian regional authorities.

== Gallery ==
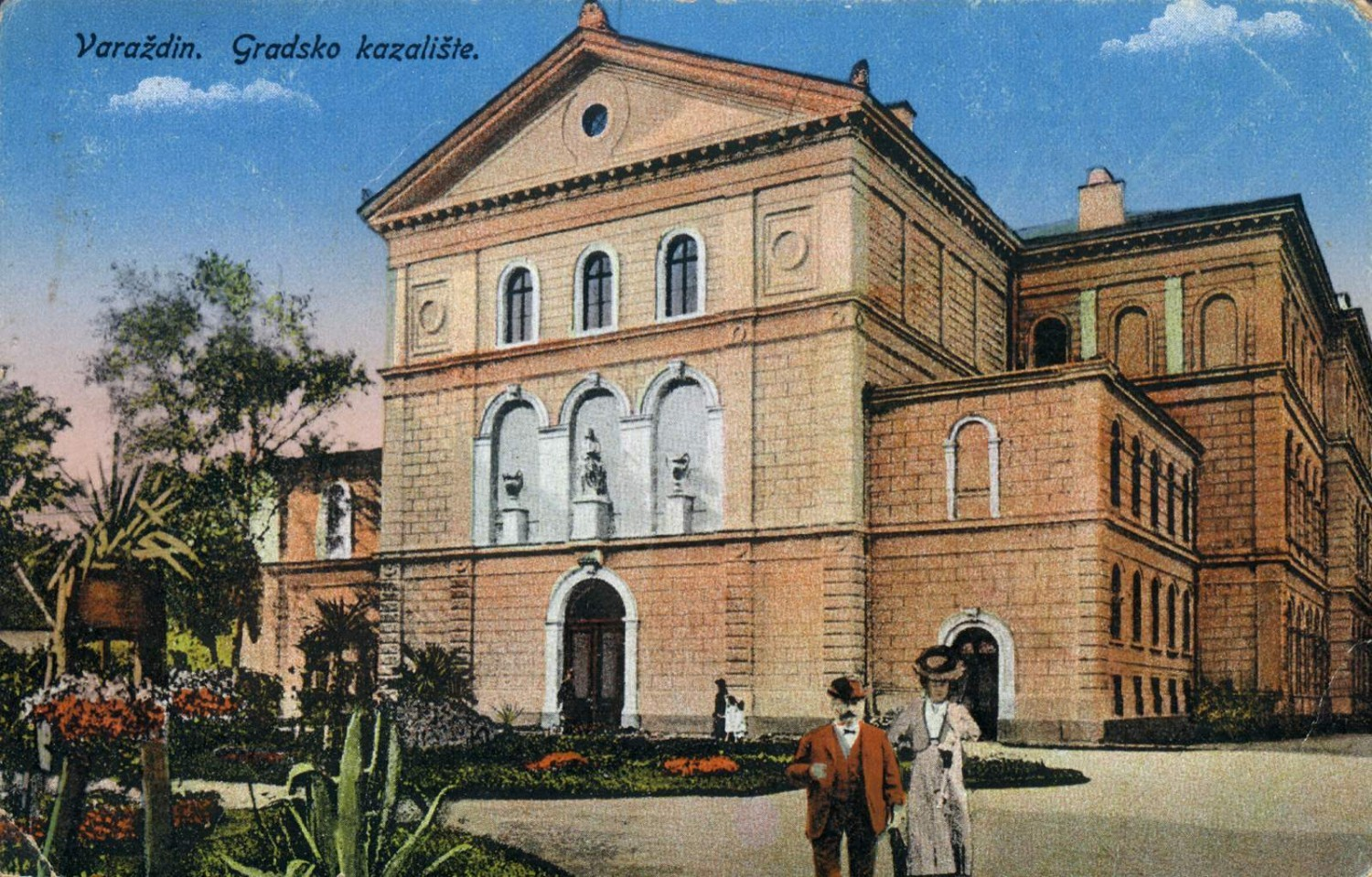
Theatre in 19th century

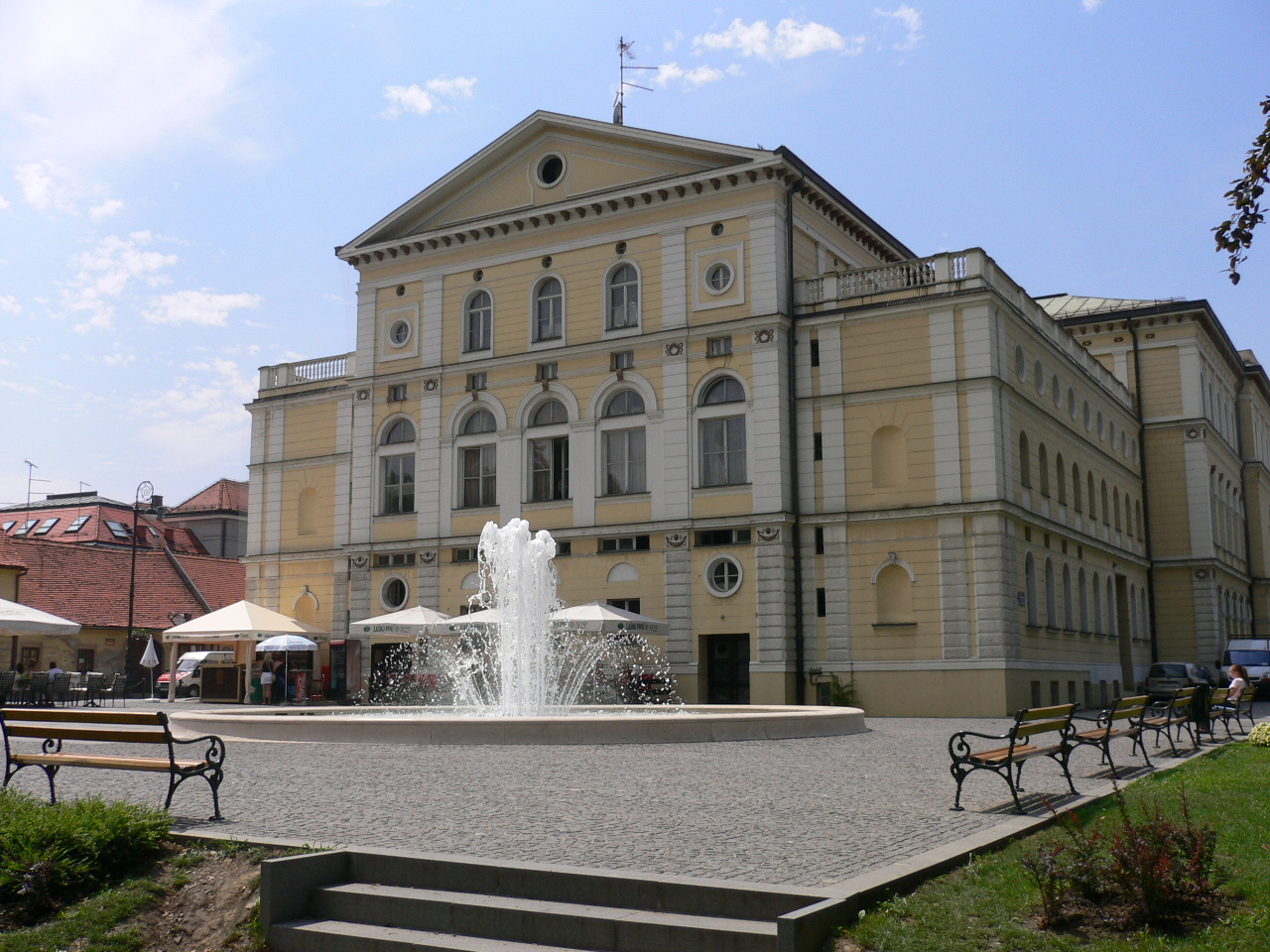
Front of the theatre

== See also ==
- Fellner & Helmer

== Sources ==
- Horvat, Siniša (2012). "Krešimir Filić – profesor u varaždinskoj Gimnaziji" [Krešimir Filić – a lecturer at Varaždin Gymnasium]. Papers of the Institute for Scientific Research Work in Varaždin (in Croatian) (23). Croatian Academy of Sciences and Arts. ISSN 1848-7890 – via Hrčak.
