= Zbelava =

- Village
- Interactive map of Zbelava
- Location of Zbelava in Croatia
- Coordinates: 46°16′55″N 16°24′28″E
- Country: Croatia
- County: Varaždin County
- City: Varaždin

Area
  - Total: 2.6 km^{2} (1.0 sq mi)

Population (2021)
  - Total: 435
  - Density: 170/km^{2} (430/sq mi)
- Time zone: UTC+1 (CET)
  - Summer (DST): UTC+2 (CEST)
- Postal code: 42202 Trnovec Bartolovečki
- Area code: +385 (0)42

Zbelava is a village in Croatia. It is connected by the D2 highway.
