= Hrašćica =

- Village
- Location of Hrašćica in Croatia
- Coordinates: 46°19′30″N 16°17′30″E
- Country: Croatia
- County: Varaždin County
- City: Varaždin

Area
  - Total: 3.5 km^{2} (1.4 sq mi)

Population (2021)
  - Total: 1,270
  - Density: 360/km^{2} (940/sq mi)
- Time zone: UTC+1 (CET)
  - Summer (DST): UTC+2 (CEST)
- Postal code: 42000 Varaždin
- Area code: +385 (0)42

Hrašćica is a suburb in Croatia. It is connected by the D2 highway.
