= Krešimir Filić =

Croatian historian and museologist (1891–1972)

Krešimir Filić (16 February 1891–31 December 1972) was a Croatian historian and museologist.

Filić was born in Bjelovar and attended a classical gymnasium in Varaždin. He studied history and geography in Vienna and Prague. He taught at the Varaždin gymnasium in the interwar period. Filić was particularly involved in the organization of the 300th anniversary of the school's founding, which was an event of national importance in 1936.

Filić also started a mountaineering society, and started extending the gymnasium into an institution of higher learning. He was instrumental in founding the city library, a city museum, and a gallery in Varaždin. He also ran the re-opened music school.

After World War II he briefly ran the City Museum in Zagreb, collaborated with the Yugoslav Academy of Sciences and Arts, consulted in the processes of founding of other museums, as well as contributed to conservation efforts elsewhere in Croatia.

== Sources ==
- Humski, Vera (1998). "FILIĆ, Krešimir". Croatian Biographical Lexicon (in Croatian). Miroslav Krleža Lexicographical Institute.
- Horvat, Siniša (2012). "Krešimir Filić – profesor u varaždinskoj Gimnaziji" [Krešimir Filić – a lecturer at Varaždin Gymnasium]. Papers of the Institute for Scientific Research Work in Varaždin (in Croatian) (23). Croatian Academy of Sciences and Arts. ISSN 1848-7890 – via Hrčak.
