= List of people with given name Stephen =

This is a list of people with the given name Stephen or Steven:

== Saints ==
- Saint Stephen (died c. 35), with the title of Protomartyr (lit. "first martyr") due to his distinct fate among the early Christians
- Stephen, one of the pair of Christian saints and martyrs Socrates and Stephen
- Stephen the Younger (ca. 715–765), Byzantine iconodule martyr
- Stephen I of Hungary (c. 965–1038), canonized in 1083
- Stephen of Obazine (1085–1154), Cistercian, first Abbot of Obazine Abbey, France
- Stephen Harding (died 1134), English, one of the founders of the Cistercian Order; Catholic saint
- Stephen III of Moldavia or Stephen the Great and Holy (c. 1432–1504)

== Royalty ==
- Stephen, Prefect of Amalfi (died 898)
- Stephen of Armenia (died 1165), marshal, son of Leo I
- Francis Stephen, Holy Roman Emperor
- Stephen Ákos, influential baron in the Kingdom of Hungary in the late 13th century and the early 14th century
- King Stephen of England or Stephen of Blois (c. 1096–1154), grandson of William the Conqueror
- Stephen I of Hungary (c. 965–1038), Grand Prince of the Magyars, first king of Hungary
- Stephen II of Hungary (1101–1131), elder son of King Coloman
- Stephen III of Hungary (1147–1172), eldest son of King Geza II
- Stephen IV of Hungary (c.1133–1165), third son of King Béla II
- Stephen V of Hungary (1239–1272), elder son of King Béla IV
- Stephen, Count Palatine of Simmern-Zweibrücken (1385–1459), son of King Rupert of Germany
- Stephen I of Moldavia (1394–1399), son of Costea
- Stephen II of Moldavia (died 1447), prince, son of Alexandru cel Bun
- Stephen III of Moldavia or Stephen the Great and Holy (c.1432–1504), son of Bogdan II
- Stephen Báthory of Poland (1533–1586), prince of Transylvania, king consort of Poland, grand duke consort of Lithuania
- Stephen Uroš I of Serbia (died 1277), son of Stefan Nemanjić
- Stephen Bocskai of Transylvania (1557–1606) prince of Transylvania and Hungary
- Stjepan Držislav of Croatia (died 997), king 969–997
- Stjepan I of Croatia (died 1058), king 1030–1058
- Stjepan II of Croatia (died 1091), king 1089–1091, last member of the Trpimirović dynasty
- Ivan Stephen of Bulgaria (died after 1343), tsar 1330–1331
- Stephen Tomašević of Bosnia (died 1463), last sovereign from the Bosnian Kotromanić dynasty

== Church figures (Stephen or Stephanus) ==
- Pope Stephen I (died 257), Bishop of Rome 254–257
- Pope-elect Stephen (died 752), elected Pope but died before being ordained
- Pope Stephen II (died 757), pope 752–757
- Pope Stephen III (720–772), pope 768–772
- Pope Stephen IV (died 817), pope 816–817
- Pope Stephen V (died 891), pope 885–891
- Pope Stephen VI (died 897), pope 896–897
- Pope Stephen VII (died 931), pope 929–931
- Pope Stephen VIII (died 942), German, pope 939–942
- Pope Stephen IX (c. 1020–1058), pope 1057–1058
- Esteban, bishop of Roman Catholic Archdiocese of Zaragoza, Spain, 1128 to 1130
- Ecumenical Patriarch Stephen I of Constantinople (867–893), patriarch 886 to 893
- Ecumenical Patriarch Stephen II of Constantinople, from Amasea, patriarch 925 to 928
- Stephanus I, Archbishop of Aquileia, Italy, c. 515
- Stephanus II, Patriarch of Grado, Italy, c. 670
- Steven J. Lopes (born 1975), Roman Catholic Bishop of the Personal Ordinariate of the Chair of Saint Peter
- Bishop Stephanos, bishop of Malankara eparchy of USA and Canada

== Others ==
- Stephen (son of Kalomaria) (fl. 886–921), a relative of Empress Theodora and a high-ranking courtier in the Byzantine court
- Stephen, pen name of Dom Orejudos (1933–1991), American erotic artist, dancer, and choreographer
- Stephanus of Byzantium, 6th century author of Ethnica, a geographical dictionary
- Stephanus, a pupil of Pasiteles (fl. 33 BCE), sculptor in the time of Caesar Augustus

=== A ===
- Stephen Aaron-Sipple (born 1987), English actor
- Stephen Adam (1848–1910), Scottish stained glass designer
- Stephen Adams (disambiguation), various people
- Stephen Adegoke, American football coach and former player
- Stephen Adekolu (born 1989), Canadian football player
- Steven A. Adelson, American film and television director
- Stephen Adler (disambiguation), multiple people
- Stephen Adye (disambiguation), multiple people
- Steven Aftergood, American anti-secrecy activist and writer
- Stephen Aintree (1957–2022), English actor, known for Kelly + Victor
- Stephen Akinmurele (1978–1999), British serial killer
- Stephen Alemais (born 1995), American baseball player
- Stephen Shepherd Allen (1882–1964), New Zealand lawyer, farmer, colonial administrator, & politician
- Stephen E. Ambrose (1936–2002), American historian, biographer, and author
- Stephen Amell (born 1981), Canadian actor
- Stephen K. Amos (born 1967), British stand up comedian and television personality
- Steven James Anderson (born 1964), American wrestler, actor, producer better known as "Stone Cold" Steve Austin
- Steven Lee Anderson (born 1981), American preacher and conspiracy theorist
- Stephen P. Anderson (born 1967), American musician, songwriter, and painter
- Stephen Wayne Anderson (1953–2002), American serial killer
- Steven Andskär (born 1964), Swedish race car driver
- Steven "Steve" Angello (born 1982), Greek-Swedish DJ, record producer, remixer and record label owner, member of electronic band Swedish House Mafia
- Steven Antin (born 1958), American actor, stunt performer, screenwriter, producer, and director
- Steven "Steve" Aoki (born 1977), Japanese musician, DJ, remixer and record producer
- Stephen Appiah (born 1980), Ghanaian former footballer
- Stephen Arigbabu (born 1972), German basketball coach and former player
- Stephen Armone (1899–1960), Sicilian-American organized criminal
- Steven F. Arnold (1943–1994), American artist and filmmaker
- Stephen E. Atkins (1941–2010), American librarian and author
- Steve Austin (character) (created 1970), Main character in Cyborg/'The Six Million Dollar Man' TV series
- Stephen F. Austin (1793–1836), American empresario
- Stephen Thomas Azar (born 1964), American singer, songwriter, guitarist, and philanthropist

=== B ===
- Steven Bach (1938–2009), American writer and lecturer
- Steven Victor Bach, American musician, composer, and musical director
- Stephen James Backshall (born 1973), British television presenter, naturalist, and writer
- Stephen John Baddeley (born 1961), English retired badminton player
- Steven W. Bailey (born 1971), American actor
- Stephen Baker (disambiguation), multiple people
- Steven Baker (disambiguation), multiple people
- Stephen Clark Balderson (born 1975), American film director
- Stephen Baldwin (disambiguation), multiple people
- Steve Ballmer, (born 1956), American executive and basketball team owner
- Stephen Bainbridge (born 1958), American law professor and writer
- Stephen H. Bancroft, American retired private school official and organizational executive
- Steven Craig Banks (born 1954), American actor, musician, comedian, and writer
- Stephen Kevin Bannon (born 1953), American businessman and political figure
- Stephen Barr (born 1953), American physicist and professor
- Steven Barr, American actor
- Stephen Barrett (disambiguation), multiple people
- Steven "Steve" Barri (born 1942), American songwriter and record producer
- Steven Barron (born 1956), Irish-British filmmaker and author
- Stephen Barton (born 1982), British composer
- Steven Mwesige Basaliza, retired Ugandan military officer
- Steven John Bator (1949–1990), American singer and musician
- Steven Bauer (born 1956), Cuban-American actor
- Steven Scott Bechler (1979–2003), American baseball player
- Stephen Bechtel Sr. (1900–1989), American company president
- Stephen Bechtel Jr. (1925–2021), American businessman, civil engineer, and company co-owner
- Stephen Beck, American artist, writer, toy designer and inventor
- Stephen Charles "Steve" Beck (1957–2015), English football club chairman
- Steven Beck, American guitarist and singer
- Steven Bednarski (born 1973), Canadian historian and former actor
- Stephen Wayne Bedrosian (born 1957), American former baseball player
- Stephen D. Behrendt, historian
- Steven Beitashour (born 1987), Iranian footballer
- Stephen Belber (born 1967), American playwright, screenwriter, and film director
- Steven Bender (1950–2010), American entrepreneur
- Stephen Vincent Benét (1898–1943), American author
- Stephen J. Benkovic (born 1938), American chemist and professor
- Stephen M. Bennett, American businessman
- Stephen Allen Benson (1816–1865), 2nd President of Liberia
- Stephen Bent, English actor
- Steven N. Berk (born 1959), American lawyer and former judge
- Steven Berkoff, (born 1937), British author, playwright, and actor
- Steven Berkowitz (born 1958), American tech business executive
- Steven M. Berlin (born 1955), American saxophonist, keyboardist, and record producer
- Steven Bernstein (born 1958), American cinematographer, director, screenwriter, and author
- Steven "Jesse" Bernstein (1950–1991), American underground writer, performance artist, and actor
- Steve Berthiaume, American television sportscaster
- Steven Best (born 1955), American activist and presenter
- Stephen Bett, English politician and former police chief
- Stephen L. Bettinger (1924–2010), American US Air Force flying ace
- Stephen Betts, British composer, songwriter, and musician
- Stephen Taylor Beuerlein (born 1965), American former football player and commentator
- Stephen John Biddulph (born 1953), Australian author, activist and psychologist
- Stephen Bienko (born 1979), American coach, athlete, and businessman
- Stephen Bienskie, American actor and singer
- Stephen Biesty (born 1961), British illustrator
- Bantu Stephen Biko (1946–1977), South African anti-apartheid activist
- Stephen Leo Bing (1965–2020), American businessman, philanthropist, and film producer
- Steven D. Bingley-Ellison (born 1983), American record producer, DJ, filmmaker and rapper
- Stephen Birch, Canadian health economist and professor
- Stephen Bishop (singer) (born 1951), American singer-songwriter, actor, and guitarist
- Steven M. Biskupic (born 1961), American attorney and former federal prosecutor
- Stephen R. Bissette (born 1955), American comics artist, editor, publisher, and educator
- Steven Blankaart (1650–1704), Dutch physician, iatrochemist, entomologist, and translator
- Steven Blane, American rabbi
- Steven Jay Blum (born 1960), American voice actor
- Steven Blush, American author, journalist, filmmaker, and record collector
- Steven Bochco (1943–2018), American TV writer, author, and producer
- Stephen Bogardus (born 1954), American actor
- Steven Kenneth Bonnell II (born 1988), American Twitch streamer, political commentator, and YouTube personality
- Stephen "tWitch" Boss (1982–2022), American freestyle hip hop dancer, choreographer, actor, television producer, and TV personality
- Stephen R. Bough (born 1970), American federal judge
- Stephen Bowen (born 1964), United States Navy submariner and a NASA astronaut, second submariner to travel into space
- Steven Ellis Bowman (1944–2017), American football player
- Stephen Elliott Boyd (born 1979), American lawyer and former DOJ official
- Steven Boyer (born 1985), American actor, comedian, and musician
- Stephen Phillip Bracks (born 1954), Australian politician and university administrator
- Stephen Bradbury (born 1954), British artist and illustrator
- Steven Gill Bradbury (born 1958), American attorney and former government official
- Steven John Bradbury (born 1973), Australian former Olympic speed skater
- Stephen Branchflower, American retired state prosecutor
- Steven Brault (born 1992), American baseball player
- Stephen Breyer, (born 1938), Associate Justice on the Supreme Court of the United States
- Stephen Lynn Bridges (1963–2012), American comedian, impressionist, and actor
- Steven Brill (born 1950), American lawyer, journalist, and entrepreneur
- Steven Brill (born 1962), American actor, film producer, director, and screenwriter
- Stephen Brodsky (born 1979), American rock musician
- Steven Brody (died 1994), American jewelry business founder
- Stephen Decatur Bross (1813–1888), American settler
- Stephen, Steven, or Steve Brooks (disambiguation), multiple people
- Stephen Brookes (born 1956), English former cricketer
- Steven or Steve Brown (disambiguation), multiple people
- Steven or Stephen Brown (disambiguation), multiple people
- Stephen Brown-Fried, American stage director
- Steven Browne (born 1989), Australian footballer
- Stephen Roger Bruce (born 1960), English former footballer and football manager
- Steven Brust (born 1955), American novelist, singer-songwriter, and musician
- Stephen Bruton (1948–2009), American actor and musician
- Stephen Bryant, English violinist
- Steven Mark Bryles (1957–2012), American politician and businessman
- Stephen Bunting (born 1984), Irish cricketer
- Stephen Bunting (born 1985), English professional darts player
- Steven Burke (born 1974), British video game composer, sound designer, and voice actor
- Stephen G. Burns, American lawyer and former government official
- Steven Michael Burns (born 1973), American actor, voice actor, singer, and musician
- Stephen Burton (born 1987), English professional darts player
- Stephen Burton (born 1989), American former football player
- Steven Vincent Buscemi (born 1957), American actor, writer, director, producer
- Stephen Butler (disambiguation), multiple people
- Stephen Byers (born 1953), English Labour Party politician, Secretary of State for Transport
- Stephen Byrne (born 1986), Irish artist and animator
- Stephen Byrne (born 1992), Irish vlogger and television personality

=== C ===
- Steven Harris Cahn (born 1947), American jazz guitarist
- Steven G. Calabresi (born 1958), American law professor and author
- Steven Caldwell (born 1980), Scottish former footballer, coach, and executive
- Stephen Calk (born 1964/1965), American bank founder and political figure
- Steven Callahan (born 1952), American author, naval architect, inventor, and sailor
- Steven J. Camp (born 1955), American singer, songwriter, and pastor
- Stephen Campbell Moore (born 1979), British actor
- Steven Canals (born 1980), American screenwriter and producer
- Steven Donato Cangialosi (born 1963), television sports broadcaster
- Stephen J. Cannell (1941–2010), American TV producer, writer, novelist, and actor
- Stephen Allan "Steve" Capus (born 1963), news executive, producter, and journalist
- Stephen Caracappa (born 1941), American federal convict and former police officer
- Stephen Antonio Cardenas (born 1974), American martial artist, musician, and actor
- Stephen Michael Cardwell (born 1950), Canadian retired ice hockey player
- Stephen Carley, American business executive
- Stephen Carlin, Scottish stand-up comedian and writer
- Stephen Carlson (born 1996), American football player
- Steven Norman Carlton (born 1944), American retired baseball player
- Stephen Carpenter (disambiguation), multiple people
- Steven or Stephen Carter (disambiguation), multiple people
- Stephen McConnell Case (born 1958), American entrepreneur, investor, businessman, and advocate
- Stephen Cassidy, American former union president, executive, and advocate
- Stephen Cassidy, Irish former Gaelic footballer
- Stephen H. Cassidy, American politician and advocate
- Steven Caulker (born 1991), English footballer
- Steven James Centanni, American former news reporter
- Stephen J. Challacombe (born 1946), English professor of oral medicine, writer, and organizational executive
- Steven Chambers (born 1990), Australian baseball player
- Steven Curtis Chapman (born 1962), American singer, songwriter, record producer, actor, author, and activist
- Stephen Pendrill Charles (1937–2025), Australian judge
- Stephan Chase (1945–2019), British actor, audio producer, director
- Stephen Chbosky (born 1970), American novelist, screenwriter, and film director
- Steven N. S. Cheung (born 1935), Hong Konger-American economics professor and author
- Stephen Chow (born 1962), Hong Kong actor, comedian and director
- Stephen Chow Sau-yan (born 1959), Hong Konger cardinal
- Stephen Clark (disambiguation), multiple people with name spelling variations
- Stephen Clarke-Willson, American computer scientist and video game producer
- Stephen Clarkson (1937–2016), Canadian political scientist, professor, and author
- Stephen Grover Cleveland (1837–1908), 22nd and 24th President of the United States
- Stephen Coate, British-American economist and professor
- Stephen Coates, British singer and music producer
- Stephen Cochran (born 1979), American country music singer-songwriter
- Stephen or Steven Cohen (disambiguation), multiple people
- Stephen Cole (born 1971), English author and audio producer
- Stephen Colbert (born 1964), American comedian, television host, actor, and writer
- Stephen Colletti (born 1986), American actor and television personality
- Stephen Collins, multiple people
- Steven Colloton (born 1963), American federal court judge
- Stephen Comey (born 1963), English-Australian actor
- Steven Robert Comisar (born 30, 1961), American convicted fraud
- Steven Conrad (born 1968), American screenwriter, film producer and director
- Stephen Constantine (born 1947), British history professor
- Stephen Constantine (born 1962), English professional football coach and former player
- Stephen John Coogan (born 1965), English actor, comedian, producer, and screenwriter
- Stephen Lawrence Cooley (born 1947), American politician, attorney, former prosecutor
- Stephen Coonts (born 1946), American author and editor
- Steven Corbin (1953–1995), American author
- Stephen A. Corker (1830–1879), American lawyer, judge, confederate, and U.S. Representative
- Stephen Corrigan (1963–20??), missing Irish man who was found dead
- Stephen Corry (born 1951), Malaysian-British anthropologist and indigenous rights activist
- Stephen Costello (born 1981), American opera singer
- Stephen Cottrell (born 1958), English Archbishop of York and author
- Stephen Covey (1932–2012), American educator, author, businessman, and speaker
- Steven Cowley (born 1959), British theoretical physicist, international authority on nuclear fusion, and administrator
- Stephen Cox, multiple people
- Stephen Crabb (born 1973), British politician and government official
- Steven Marshall Crabb (born 1943), Australian former politician
- Stephen Paul "Steve" Crabb (born 1963), British former runner
- Stephen Craig (born 1967), Australian bobsledder
- Stephen L. Craig, American chemistry professor and organizational head
- Stephen Craigan (born 1976), Northern Irish former footballer
- Stephen Craigie (born 1990), English former snooker player
- Stephen Crainey (born 1981), Scottish former footballer
- Steven Cramer (born 1953), American poet
- Stephen Crane (1871–1900), American novelist and journalist
- Steven "Stevie" Crawford (1960–1963), American toddler, identified decades after death
- Steven Crea (born 1947), American federal convict
- Steven Crea Jr. (born 1972), American federal convict
- Stephen Crean (1947–1985), Australian public servant
- Steven Croft (disambiguation), multiple people
- Stephen Crohn (1946–2013), American genetically immune to HIV
- Steven P. Croley, American lawyer, professor, and former government official
- Steven S. Crompton (born 1962), Canadian artist, author, and game/comic designer
- Steven Paul Crook (born 1983), Australian former cricketer and vocalist
- Steven Lee Cropper (born 1941), AKA "The Colonel", American guitarist, songwriter, and record producer
- Steven Kent Crosby (born 1950), American former professional football coach and player
- Steven Crouch (born 1977), Australian former rugby player
- Steven David Croudson (born 1980), English former footballer and coach
- Steven Crowder (born 1987), American-Canadian political commentator and media host
- Steven Crowell, American philosopher and professor
- Stephen James Crowther (born 1957), English political figure, writer, and businessman
- Steven Culp (born 1955), American actor
- Stephen and Steven Cummings (disambiguation), multiple people
- Steven Cummins (born 1992), Australian rugby player
- Steven D. Cuozzo (born 1950), American writer, columnist, editor, and critic
- Stephen Curry (born 1988), American basketball player
- Stephen Thomas Curwood (born 1947), American journalist, author, public radio personality, and actor
- Stephen Custer (1943–2025), American musician and professor
- Stephen M. Cutler, American lawyer and former government official

=== D ===
- Steven David Daines (born 1962), American politician, US Senator, and former corporate executive
- Stephen Daldry (born 1960), English director and producer
- Stephen Louis Dalkowski Jr. (1939–2020), American baseball player
- Steven DaLuz (born 1953), American artist
- Steven Damman (born 1952), American infant who disappeared
- Stephen Dando-Collins (born 1950), Australian author and novelist
- Stephen Daniele, artist and illustrator
- Steven L. Danver, American historian
- Stephen Heard Darden (1816–1902), American state legislator and Confederate officer
- Stephen Darlington (born 1952), British choral director and conductor
- Steven Davis, American business executive
- Steven De Petter (born 1985), Belgian retired footballer
- Steven E. de Souza (born 1947), American screenwriter, producer, and director of film and TV
- Steven De Vuyst (born 1987), Belgian politician
- Stephen Decatur Sr. (1751–1808), British-American privateer, US Navy captain
- Stephen Decatur Jr. (1779–1820), American US naval officer and commodore
- Stefanos Dedas (born 1982), basketball head coach in the Israel Basketball Premier League
- Steven Dehler (born 1987), American model
- Stephen Delancey (disambiguation), multiple people
- Steven Leroy dePyssler (1919–2020), American officer in the United States Air Force
- Stephen Denmark (born 1996), American football player
- Steven Boghos Derounian (1918–2007), Bulgarian-American U.S. representative, attorney, and professor
- Stephen Desper, American audio engineer w
- Stephen Deutsch (born 1945), American composer and professor
- Stephen DeWolf (1833–1907), American lawyer, politician, and judge
- Stephen Dick (born 1985), Scottish field hockey player
- Steven J. Dick (born 1949), American astronomer, author, and historian of science
- Stephen Dillane (born 1957), English actor
- Stephen Dillard (born 1969), American state court judge
- Stephen John Ditko (1927–2018), American comics artist
- Stephen Dix Jr. (born 2002), American football player
- Stephen Dixon (born 1985), Canadian ice hockey player
- Stephen Dobyns (born 1941), American poet and novelist
- Stephen Donaldson (1946–1996), American political activist and writer
- Stephen R. Donaldson (born 1947), American novelist
- Steven Donziger (born 1961), American attorney and former journalist
- Stephen James Doocy (born 1956), American TV host, political commentator, and author
- Stephen W. Doran (born 1956), American former Massachusetts state legislator and convicted criminal
- Stephen Dorff (born 1973), American actor
- Stephen Wallace Dorsey (1842–1916), Reconstruction era member of the United States Senate
- Stephen Douglas (disambiguation), multiple people
- Steven Drench (born 1985), English footballer
- Stephen C. Dries, American federal judge and attorney
- Steven Drizin, American lawyer and professor
- Steven Drozd (born 1969), American musician, songwriter, composer, and actor
- Stephen J. Dubner (born 1963), American author, journalist, and podcast/radio host
- Stephen Duffy (born 1960), English musician, singer, and songwriter
- Steven Duffy (born 1980), Scottish former rugby player
- Steven Duggar (born 1993), American baseball player
- Steven Dunbar Jr. (born 1995), American football player
- Stephen Duncan (1787–1867), American plantation owner in the Antebellum South
- Stephen Dunifer (born 1952), American radio engineer and activist
- Stephen Francis Patrick Aloysius Dunleavy (1938–2019), Australian journalist
- Stephen Dunn (disambiguation), multiple people
- Stephen Dunne (disambiguation), multiple people
- Steven Duren (born 1956), American singer-songwriter
- Stephen Dycus (born 1941), American law professor and author

=== E ===
- Steven J. Eagle, American law professor and writer
- Stephen Tyree Early (1889–1951), American journalist and government official
- Steven Eckholdt (born 1961), American actor
- Steven Ediger (born 1956), American lawyer and former Kansas state legislator
- Steven Bradley Edlefsen (born 1985), American former baseball player
- Steven Ehrlich (born 1946), American architect
- Steven Eisman (born 1962), American businessman and investor
- Stephen Benton Elkins (1841–1911), American industrialist and political figure
- Stephen Elliott (disambiguation), various people
- Stephen Ellis (disambiguation), multiple people
- Steven Ellis (disambiguation), multiple people
- Stephen Elop (born 1963), Canadian businessman and technology executive
- Stephen Elyot (died c.1395), English politician and vintner
- Steven Emerson (born 1954), American journalist, author, and commentator
- Stephen Emmer (born 1958), Dutch composer, arranger, producer, sound designer and musician
- Steven Andrew Engel (born 1974), American lawyer who served in government
- Stephen Michael Erickson (born 1950), American novelist
- Steven P. Erie (born 1946), American political scientist and urban studies scholar
- Steven Erikson (born 1959), Canadian novelist
- Steven Erlanger (born 1952), American journalist
- Stephen Thomas Erlewine (born 1973), American music critic and editor
- Stephen Espinoza (born 1970), American executive businessman
- Stephen Antunes Eustáquio (born 1996), Canadian soccer player
- Stephen R. Evans, (?–2017), Malaysian politician, public administrator, and author
- Stephen Eze (born 1994), Nigerian professional footballer

=== F ===
- Stephen Farrelly (born 1978), Irish wrestler and actor
- Stephen Fearing (born 1963), Canadian singer-songwriter and musician
- Steven Fechter, American playwright and professor
- Stephen Anthony Ferlazzo Jr., American keyboard player
- Steven Fielding (born 1961), professor of political history and author
- Stephen Fincher (born 1973), American politician, former US representative
- Stephen Findeisen (born 1993/1994) American YouTuber and cryptocurrency journalist
- Steven Findlay (born 1985), Scottish international rugby player
- Steven Fine historian of Judaism, professor, and author
- Steven Finitsis (born 1983), Australian former squash player
- Steven Finn (disambiguation), multiple people
- Steven Roger Fischer (born 1947), New Zealand linguist and author
- Steven Fish (born 1962), American professor of political science and author
- Stephen Fishbach (born 1979), American writer, consultant, and former reality show participant
- Stephen Fisher (born 1963), American actor, director, producer and writer
- Steven W. Fisher (1946–2010), American attorney and judge
- Steven R. Finch (born 1959), American mathematician
- Stephen Flaherty, (born 1960), American composer
- Steven Flanagan, American physician, professor, and medical director
- Stephen Flemmi (born 1934), American organized criminal
- Steven Fletcher (disambiguation), multiple people
- Steven Florio (1949–2007), American magazine publisher and business executive
- Stephen Flowers (born 1953), American author and occultist
- Stephen Flynn (disambiguation), multiple people
- Stephen Fodor (born 1953), American biological scientist and businessman
- Steven or Stephen Ford (disambiguation), multiple people
- Stephen Forde (1914–1992), English footballer
- Stephen Foster (1826–1864), American songwriter
- Stephen Foxwell, school administrator and teacher
- Stephen Frail (born 1969), Scottish footballer and coach
- Stephen Frampton (born 1969), Irish sportsperson
- Stephen Francis, a convicted murderer in Singapore
- Stephen Robert Franken (1932–2012), American actor
- Steven Frautschi (born 1933), American theoretical physicist and professor
- Stephen Frears (born 1941), English film and TV director and producer
- Stephen Freind (born 1944), American politician
- Steven French (actor), American actor, television announcer, and voice actor
- Steven French (philosopher), emeritus professor of philosophy at University of Leeds
- Stephen Frey, American author and financier
- Stephen Frick (born 1964), American astronaut and a veteran of two Space Shuttle missions
- Stephen Friedman (born 1937), American former bank chairman and presidential advisor
- Steven Friedman (born 1953), South African academic, journalist, and activist
- Steven Fromholz (1945–2014), American entertainer and singer-songwriter
- Stephen Frost (born 1955), English actor and comedian
- Stephen Fry (born 1957), British actor, comedian, and television presenter
- Steven Fulop (born 1977), American politician, former marine
- Stephen Fung (born 1974), Hong Kong actor and director
- Steven Furlano (born 1998), Canadian soccer player
- Stephen Furst (1954–2017), American actor, director and producer
- Steven Jonathan Furst (born 1967), British comedian, actor and writer
- Steven Furtick (born 1980), American pastor, songwriter, and author

=== G ===
- Stephen Kendall Gadd (born 1945), American drummer, percussionist, and session musician
- Stephen Gaghan (born 1965), American screenwriter and director
- Stephen Gallacher (born 1974), Scottish golfer
- Stephen Gallagher (born 1954), English screenwriter and novelist
- Stephen Gallagher (born 1980), Irish cyclist and coach
- Stephen Gard, American law professor and editor
- Stephen Garlick (born 1959), British actor
- Stephen Garrett (born 1957), British film and television producer
- Stephen Ellis Garrett (1974–2008), AKA Static Major, American singer, songwriter, and record producer
- Stephen Gaskin (1935–2014), American counterculture icon, commune founder, spiritual teacher, political activist
- Stephen Gately (1976–2009), Irish singer, actor, and author
- Steven Gault (born 1973), Canadian criminal, outlaw biker, and police informant
- Steve Gelbs (born 1987), American sportscaster and sports reporter
- Stephen Geoffreys (born 1964), American actor
- Steven Geray (1904–1973), Hungarian-American actor, theater director, businessman
- Steven Gerrard (born 1980), English football manager and former player
- Stephen Gethins (born 1976), Scottish politician
- Steven Gey (1956–2011), American legal scholar and editor
- Stephen Geyer (born 1950), American songwriter, guitarist, and TV writer
- Steven Gilborn (1936–2009), American actor and educator
- Stephen Gillers, American law professor
- Steven R. Gilmore, artist and graphic designer
- Stephen Girard (1750–1831), American philanthropist, banker, and slave owner
- Steven M. Girvin, American physicist, professor, and organizational director
- Stephen Glass (died 1990), Hungarian-British photographer
- Stephen Glass (born 1972), American former journalist known for fabricating numerous stories
- Stephen Glass (born 1976), Scottish former footballer
- Stephen Kramer Glickman (born 1979), American actor
- Stephen H. Gloucester (1802–1850), American pastor and an organizer of the Underground Railroad
- Stephen C. Glover (born 1990), American screenwriter, rapper, actor, and producer
- Steven Gluzband (born 1952), American trumpeter
- Steven Gluckstein (born 1990), American gymnast and coach
- Stephen Gogolev (born 2004), Canadian figure skater
- Stephen Goldblatt (born 1945), South African-born British cinematographer
- Stephen Goldin (born 1947), American author and former scientist
- Steven Goldmann (1961–2015), Canadian film and music video director
- Stephen Goldring (1908–1996), American businessman and philanthropist
- Steven F. Goldstone (born 1946), American business executive, board member, and attorney
- Steven Aaron Golin (1955–2019), American film and television producer and businessman
- Steven Gonzales, American film editor
- Steven Goode, American lawyer and professor
- Stephen Goodin (born 1988), American football player
- Stephen Gorard, British professor and author
- Steven Dean Gordon (born 1969), American serial killer and sex offender
- Stephen Kendal Gordy (born 1975), American rapper, singer, songwriter, dancer, record producer and DJ
- Stephen Goss, Welsh composer, guitarist and academic
- Stephen Gosnell (born 2001), American football player
- Stephen Gostkowski (born 1984), American former football player
- Stephen Gould (1962–2023), American operatic tenor
- Steven Charles Gould (born 1955), American science fiction author and teacher
- Stephen Jay Gould (1941–2002), American paleontologist, evolutionary biologist, and historian of science
- Stephen Graham (born 1982), American basketball player and coach
- Stephen Victor Graham (1874–1955), 18th Governor of American Samoa
- Stephen Grammauta (1916–2016), American organized criminal
- Steven B. Grant (born 1983), American attorney and mayor
- Steven Gray (disambiguation), several people
- Stephen A. D. Greaves Sr. (1817–1880), American army officer, plantation owner, lawyer, and state legislator
- Stephen A. D. Greaves Jr. (1854–1915), American planter and state legislator
- Steven or Stephen Green (disambiguation), multiple people
- Stephen Greenblatt (born 1943), American Shakespearean, literary historian, and author
- Steven or Stephen Greene (disambiguation), multiple people
- Steven Greenstreet (born 1979), American documentary filmmaker and journalist
- Steven M. Greer (born 1955), American ufologist and retired physician
- Stephen Greif (1944–2022), English actor
- Steven Grieveson (born 1970), British serial killer
- Stephen Griffiths (born 1969), British serial killer and cannibal
- Stephen Joseph Grilli (born 1949), American former baseball player
- Steven D. Grimberg (born 1974), American federal court judge and former DOJ official
- Stephen B. Grimes (1927–1988), English production designer and art director
- Stephen H. Grimes (1927–2021), American lawyer, jurist, and educator
- Steven "Clem" Grogan (born 1951), American convicted murderer part of the Manson Family
- Steven Grossman (1951–1991), American singer-songwriter
- Stephen Guarino (born 1975), American actor and comedian
- Steven Gubser (1972–2019), American physics professor
- Stephen Guidry (American football) (born 1997), American football player
- Steven Guilbeault (born 1970), Canadian politician, environmentalist, and author
- Stephen Adly Guirgis (born 1965), American playwright, screenwriter, director, and actor
- Steven Gundry (born 1950), American doctor and author
- Stephen Gunzenhauser (born 1942), American music conductor
- Stephen K. Guolla (born 1973), Canadian retired ice hockey player
- Steven Robert Guttenberg (born 1958), American actor, author, producer, and director
- Stephen Gwynn (1864–1950), Irish journalist, biographer, author, poet, and politician
- Stephen Gyllenhaal (born 1949), American film director and poet

=== H ===
- Stephen Hackett (disambiguation), multiple people
- Stephen Hadley, multiple people
- Steven Haft (born 1949), American media executive, attorney, and film producer
- Stephen Hagan (disambiguation), multiple people
- Steven Hager (born 1951), American writer, journalist, filmmaker, and cannabis rights activist
- Stephen Haggard (1911–1943), British actor, writer and poet
- Stephen Hague (born 1960), American record producer
- Stephen Hahn (disambiguation), multiple people
- Steven Hahn (born 1951), history professor and author
- Stephen G. Haines (1945–2012), American organizational theorist, management consultant, and author
- Stephen Hale, multiple people
- Stephen Hales, multiple people
- Steven, Stephen, or Steve Hall (disambiguation), multiple people
- Steven Hallard (born 1965), British archer
- Stephen Halliwell (disambiguation), multiple people
- Steven Hallworth (born 1995), English former snooker player
- Stephen Halperin (born 1942), Canadian mathematician
- Steven Halpern, American musician
- Steven Vincent Hamas (1907–1974), American football player and boxer
- Steven Jon Hambleton (born 1961), Australian physician and organizational executive
- Stephen Hannock (born 1951), American painter
- Stephen Harper (born 1959), 22nd Prime Minister of Canada and one of the leaders of War in Afghanistan
  - Stephen Harper (disambiguation), multiple people
- Stephen John Harrington (1959–2015), Welsh singer and nightclub host and promoter
- Stephen Harris (disambiguation), multiple people
- Steven Harris (disambiguation), multiple people
- Stephen R. Hart (born 1958), Canadian actor
- Stephen Hartke (born 1952), American composer
- Steven Scott Harwell (1967–2023), American singer and musician
- Steven Hassan (born 1953), American author, educator, mental health counselor
- Stephen D. Hassenfeld (1942–1989), American businessman and the former CEO and chairman of Hasbro
- Stephen Hawking (1942–2018), British theoretical physicist
- Stephen Hawkins (born 1971), Australian rower
- Stephen F. Hayes, American journalist and author
- Stephen Heard (1740–1815), American state governor, state legislator, and military officer
- Stephen J. Hemsley (born 1952), American organizational executive
- Stephen Hendrie (born 1995), Scottish footballer
- Stephen Hendry (born 1969), British snooker player
- Stephen Hepburn (born 1959), British politician
- Stephen Herek (born 1958), American film director
- Steven L. Herman, American journalist and author
- Steven Herzberg (born 1957), English-Australian cricketer
- Stephen Higgins (disambiguation), multiple people
- Stephen Hill, American producer, creator and radio host
- Stephen Clancy Hill (1976–2010), American adult actor who killed a coworker
- Stephen Hillenburg (1961–2018), American cartoonist, animator and creator of SpongeBob SquarePants
- Stephen Hilton, English composer, record producer, YouTuber & influencer
- Steven M. Hilton (born 1950), American philanthropist
- Steven Hirsch (born 1961), business founder of an adult entertainment company
- Steven Ho (born 1973), American martial artist, stunt coordinator, and stuntman
- Steven Ho Chun-yin (born 1979), Hong Konger politician
- Stephen Hodges, English educator and school administrator
- Steven Hoefflin, American plastic surgeon
- Steven Hoffenberg (1945–2022), American financial criminal
- Steven Hoggett (born 1971), British choreographer and movement director
- Steven Holcomb (1980–2017), American bobsledder
- Stephen Holden (born 1941), American writer, music and film critic, and poet
- Stephen Dewar Holden (1870–1918), British engineer
- Stephen or Steve Holland (disambiguation), multiple people
- Stephen Hopkins (disambiguation), multiple people
- Stephen Hough (born 1961), British-Australian pianist, composer, and author
- Steven Houghton (born 1971), British actor and singer
- Stephen James Howe (born 1947), English musician, songwriter and producer
- Stephen R. Hudis (born 1957), English actor, stunt coordinator, and director
- Steven Hull (born 1967), American artist
- Stephen Huneck (1948–2010), American wood carving artist, furniture maker, painter, and author
- Stephen Huszar (born 1984), Canadian actor
- Steven Hutchinson (born 1968), German basketball coach and former player
- Steven Hyden (born 1977), American music critic and podcast host
- Steven Hydes (born 1986), English person found abandoned as an infant
- Stephen Hymer (1934–1974), Canadian economist

=== I ===
- Steven Ilous (born 1981), producer, director, and writer
- Steven Alan Inskeep (born 1968), American journalist, radio host, and author
- Stephen Ireland (born 1986), Irish former footballer
- Stephen James Irons (born 1958), Australian politician
- Steven or Stephen Irwin (disambiguation), multiple people
- Steven Douglas Israel (born 1969), former American football player
- Steven Isserlis (born 1958), British cellist and author
- Steven Izenour (1940–2001), American architect, urbanist, theorist, and educator
- Stephen Robert Irwin (1962–2006) Australian zookeeper and conservationist

=== J ===
- Steven or Stephen Jackson, multiple people
- Steven Allan Jensen (1955–2022), American ice hockey player, hockey camp owner, and hockey instructor
- Stephen Jenyns (1450–1523), English merchant and school founder
- Steven B. Jepson (born 1960), American opera singer and acting coach
- Stephen S. Jewett (1858–1932), American lawyer and New Hampshire state legislator
- Steven Jobs (1955–2011), American business magnate, industrial designer, investor, media proprietor, executive and co-founder of Apple Inc. and CEO of NeXT, pioneer of the personal computer revolution
- Stephen Joffe (born 1991), Canadian actor and singer
- Stephen Johnson (disambiguation), multiple people
- Steven Johnson (disambiguation), multiple people
- Steven Nicholas Jolley (born 1950), English songwriter, record producer, and convicted criminal
- Stephen Jones (disambiguation), multiple people
- Stephen, Steven, or Steve Jordan (disambiguation), multiple people
- Stephen Joyce (disambiguation), multiple people
- Stephen Juba (1914–1993), Canadian politician
- Steven Judy (1956–1981), American mass murderer and suspected serial killer
- Stephen G. Jurczyk (1962–2023), American engineer & NASA administrator

=== K ===
- Stephen Kalinich (born 1942), American poet and music collaborator
- Stephen Kaltenbach (born 1940), American artist and author
- Steven Kampmann (born 1947), American actor, writer, and director
- Stephen David Kandel (1927–2023), American television writer and author
- Stephen Kaplan (1940–1995), paranormal investigator, organizational executive, and author
- Stephen Kaplan, American professor of psychology
- Steven Kaplan, American businessman and team owner
- Stephen P. Karns, American lawyer
- Stephen M. Katz, American cinematographer
- Stephen T. Kay (born 1963), American actor, director, and writer
- Steven Kay, British international criminal lawyer
- Stephen Kaye (born 1951), Australian judge
- Steven Michael Kazee (born 1975), American actor and singer
- Steven Phillip Kazmierczak (1980–2008), American school shooter
- Stephen Kean (born 1967), Scottish football manager and former player
- Stephen F. Keating (1918–2001), American technology executive and attorney
- Stephen Paul Keirn (born 1951), American retired professional wrestler
- Steven Kellogg (born 1941), American author and illustrator
- Stephen Kellogg (born 1976), American singer-songwriter
- Stephen Wright Kellogg (1822–1904), American politician, attorney, military officer and judge
- Stephen Kenny, Australian lawyer
- Stephen Kenny (born 1971), Irish football manager and former player
- Stephen A. Kent, Canadian professor of sociology and author
- Stephen Kerr (born 1960), British politician
- Stephen Douglas Kerr (born 1965), American basketball coach and former player
- Steven Kerr (born 1989), Scottish former footballer
- Stephen Ketel, American politician
- Steven Khalil, Australian bridal and fashion designer
- Steven R. Kidd (1911–1987), American illustrator, instructor, and deacon
- Steven John Kilbey (born 1954), Australian singer-songwriter and writer
- Stephen King (born 1947), American author
- Steven Kinney (born 1987), American soccer player
- Steven Kinniburgh (born 1989), Scottish former footballer and manager
- Stephen Alan Kipner (born 1950), American-born Australian songwriter and record producer
- Steven Kirby (born 1977), English former cricketer, cricket and bowling coach
- Steven Thomas Kirby (born 1952), former Lieutenant Governor of South Dakota
- Steven Klein, multiple people
- Steve Knapman, Australian television producer
- Steven or Steve Knight (disambiguation), multiple people
- Stephen Koch (born 1941), American novelist, essayist, historian, and teacher
- Stephen Koch (born 1968), American adventurer, extreme snowboarder, & mountaineer
- Steven Koecher (born 1979), American man who disappeared
- Stephen F. Kolzak, casting director and activist
- Stephen Kosgei Kibet (born 1986), Kenyan runner
- Stephen V. Kobasa (born 1948), American teacher, journalist, and Christian political activist
- Stephen Kotkin (born 1959), American historian, academic, and author
- Steven Kotler (born 1967), American author, journalist, and entrepreneur
- Steven Koutsis, American diplomat
- Stephen Kovacevich (1940–2026), American classical pianist and conductor
- Stephen Kovacs (1972–2022), American saber fencer and fencing coach, charged with sexual assault, died in prison
- Steven Jon Kragthorpe (1965–2024), American football coach and player
- Steven Krasner (born 1953), American sports journalist and author of children's books
- Stephen D. Krasner (born 1942), American academic and former diplomat
- Stephen F. Kroft (born 1945), American retired journalist
- Steven Wynn "Steve" Kubby (1946–2022), American political activist and author
- Stephen S. Kudla (born 1950), American mathematician and professor
- Stephen Kunken (born 1971), American actor
- Steven T. Kuykendall (1947–2021), American politician and member of the U.S. House of Representatives
- Steven Kwan (born 1997), American baseball player

=== L ===
- Stephen Lack (born 1946), Canadian artist, actor, and screenwriter
- Stephen N. Lackey (born 1980), American philanthropist and political fundraiser
- Steven or Steve Lacy (disambiguation), multiple people
- Stephen P. Laffey (born 1962), American politician, businessman, and author
- Steven Michael Lake (born 1957), American former baseball player
- Stephen Paul Lamacq (born 1964), English disc jockey
- Stephen Lambert (disambiguation), multiple people
- Steven Lampier (born 1984), British cyclist
- Steven Landek (born 1955), American politician
- Stephen James Lander (born 1947), British intelligence officer, administrator, & academic
- Stephen Landesberg (1936–2010), American actor, comedian, and voice actor
- Steven E. Landsburg (born 1954), American professor of economics and author
- Stephen Lang (born 1952), American screen and stage actor, and playwright
- Steven Lang (born 1987), Swiss footballer
- Steven or Stephen Langdon (disambiguation), multiple people
- Stephen Langlois, American chef and author
- Stephen Langridge, British stage and opera director
- Stephen Langton (c.1150–1228), English Catholic cardinal, archbishop, and writer
- Steven Daniel Langton (born 1984), American bobsledder
- Stephen R Lankton (born 1947), American psychotherapist, lecturer, author, and journal editor
- Steven Lannum (born 1995), American entertainer with "AreYouKiddingTV"
- Stephen Philip Lansdown (born 1952), English businessman and sports team owner
- Stephen Lanza (born 1957), American retired US Army lieutenant general
- Stephen Laurence, British scientist and philosopher
- Stephen R. Lawhead (born 1950), American fiction and non-fiction author
- Stephen Lawrence (disambiguation), multiple people
- Stephen Leacock (1869–1944), Canadian teacher, political scientist, author, and humourist
- Stephen D. Lebovitz (born 1962), American business executive
- Stephen Ledogar (1929–2010), American ambassador and diplomat
- Steven or Stephen Lee (disambiguation), multiple people
- Stephen Lee Hock Khoon, a convicted murderer in Singapore
- Stephen Leone (born 1948), American chemist and professor
- Stephen Leopold (born 1951), Canadian real estate businessman
- Stephen R. Leopold, American former state legislator
- Steven Levenson (born 1984), American playwright and television writer
- Steven Levitan (born 1962), American television producer, director, and screenwriter
- Steven Levitsky (born 1968), American political scientist, professor, and author
- Steven David Levitt (born 1967), American economist, professor, and writer
- Stephen Lewis (1926–2015), English actor, comedian, director, screenwriter and playwright
- Steven V. Ley (born 1945), English professor of chemistry
- Steven Paul Lieberman (born 1958), American singer, songwriter, musician, composer, arranger, & producer
- Stephen Lilwall (born 1970), English former footballer
- Stephen Alan Lillywhite (born 1955), English music producer
- Stephen N. Limbaugh Jr. (born 1952), American federal judge
- Stephen N. Limbaugh Sr. (born 1927), American former federal judge
- Steven Ernest Linares, Gibraltarian teacher, trade unionist, barrister and former politician
- Stephen Decatur Lindsey (1828–1884), American politician and lawyer
- Steven Lindsey (born 1960), retired U.S. Air Force officer and NASA astronaut, Chief of the NASA Astronaut Office
- Stephen Lings, English wildlife artist
- Stephen J. Lippard (born 1940), American professor and researcher in chemistry fields
- Stephen Lipson (born 1954), English record producer, audio engineer, guitarist, and songwriter
- Steven Lisberger (born 1951), American film director, producer, and writer
- Stephen Lemi Lokuron, South Sudanese politician
- Stephen Martin Lomas (born 1974), Northern Irish football manager and former footballer
- Steven James Lomasney (born 1977), American former baseball player
- Steven Mark Lonegan (born 1956), American businessman and politician
- Steven Longa (born 1994), Cameroonian former American football player
- Stephen Looker (born 1977), American musician
- Steven López (born 1978), American taekwondo competitor and Olympian
- Steven M. Lopez (born 1953), American journalist
- Stephen R. Lorenz (born 1951), American retired US Air Force general and organizational executive
- Steven Lubet, American legal scholar and author
- Steven Lugerner, American musician
- Steven Lukather, American guitarist, singer, songwriter, arranger and record producer
- Stephen Lungu (1942–2021), Zimbabwean evangelist
- Stephen Lush (1753–1825), American lawyer, military officer, and state legislator
- Stephen Lusher (born 1945), Australian former legislator
- Stephen Lushington (disambiguation), multiple people
- Stephen Lustig-Webb (born 1971), English television personality
- Steven Lutvak (1959–2023), American composer
- Stephen Richard Lyman (born 1982), American jazz drummer, composer, and educator
- Stephen Lynch (disambiguation), multiple people

=== M ===
- Steven Machat (born 1952), American lawyer, entertainment mogul, and producer
- Stephen James "Steve" Mackall (born 1959), Canadian-American voice actor, voice-over announcer, comedian, director, screenwriter, and songwriter
- Steven Mackintosh (born 1967), English actor and narrator
- Steven Joseph Macko (1954–1981), American baseball player
- Steven "Steve" MacLean (born 1954), Canadian astronaut
- Steven Madden (born 1958), American fashion designer, businessman, and convict
- Stephen Maguire (born 1981), Scottish snooker player
- Stephen Malik, American team owner and executive
- Stephen Malkmus (born 1966), American indie rock musician
- Stephen Mallan (born 1967), Scottish former footballer
- Stephen Patrick Mallan (born 1996), Scottish footballer
- Stephen Mallatratt (1947–2004), English playwright, television screenwriter, and actor
- Stephen Mallinder (born 1955), English artist, musician, writer, and academic
- Stephen Mallinga (1943–2013), Ugandan medical doctor, government official, and politician
- Stephen Mallon (born 1999), Northern Irish professional footballer
- Stephen Mallory (1812 – November 9, 1873), American US Senator, later Confederate Navy Secretary
- Stephen Mallory II (1848–1907), American US Representative and US Senator
- Stephen Arnold "Steve" Mandell (1941–2018), American bluegrass guitarist and banjoist
- Steven Mandis (born 1970), American investor, executive, educator, and author
- Stephen James Mangan (born 1968), English actor, writer, comedian and presenter
- Stephen Marche (born 1976), Canadian author, essayist, and cultural commentator
- Stephen Marchesi (born 1951), American artist and illustrator
- Stephen Marchionda, American classical guitarist
- Stephen Marcus (born 1962), British actor
- Stephen Marcussen, American music engineer and producer
- Steven Marković (born 1985), Australian basketball player
- Stephen Marks, English college head of the 16th century
- Stephen Marks (born 1946), British fashion businessman
- Stephen Marks (born 1958), American economist
- Steven M. Martin (born 1954), American actor and filmmaker
- Steven Matz (born 1991), American baseball player
- Stephen McCauley (born 1955), American author and professor
- Stephen McCoy (1948–1989), American convicted murderer
- Stephen McDonell, Australian journalist
- Steven McDonnell (born 1979), Irish footballer
- Stephen McDonnell (born 1989), Irish hurler
- Stephen McEveety (born 1954), American film producer
- Stephen McFeely (born 1970), American screenwriter and producer
- Stephen Joseph McGroarty (1830–1870), Irish American soldier
- Stephen McHattie (born 1946), Canadian actor
- Stephen LaTreal McNair (1973–2009), American professional football quarterback
- Stephen Anthony McNallen (born 1948), American new religious movement leader and activist
- Stephen McNally (born 1911–1994), American actor
- Stephen Patrick McNally (born 1978), English singer and songwriter
- Stephen McNeff (born 1951), British composer
- Stephen McNeilly (born 1968), English artist, writer, and editor
- Stephen McNichols (1914–1997), American politician
- Steven McNicoll, Scottish actor, director, playwright and television presenter
- Steven McNiven, Canadian comic book artist
- Steven McRae (born 1985), Australian ballet and tap dancer
- Steve McQueen (born 1930), American actor
- Steven R. McQueen (born 1988), American actor
- Stephen Mear (born 1964), English dancer, choreographer, and director
- Stephen Meeks (born 1970), American state politician
- Steven Menashi (born 1979), American federal court judge and former government official
- Steven Douglas Merryday (born 1950), American federal judge
- Steven Michael Mesler (born 1978), American bobsledder and non-profit executive
- Stephen Metcalf (born 1964), American columnist and podcaster
- Steven Mierdman (c.1510–1559), Dutch publisher of Reformation books
- Steven Meisel (born 1954), American fashion photographer
- Stephen Merchant (born 1974), British writer, director, radio presenter, and actor
- Stephan P. Mickle (1944–2021), American federal court judge
- Stephen Miles (disambiguation), multiple people
- Stephen Miller (disambiguation), multiple people
- Stephen Milligan (1948–1994), British politician and journalist
- Stephen Milling (born 1965), Danish operatic bass
- Stephen C. Miner (born 1951), American film and TV director
- Stephen Mitchell (born 1943), American translator, scholar, anthologist, and poet
- Steven Mitchell (born 1994), American football player
- Steven Mnuchin (born 1962), 77th United States Secretary of the Treasury
- Steven William Moffat (born 1961), Scottish television writer and producer
- Stephen Moffitt (1837–1904), American military officer and politician
- Stephen Mogaka, Kenyan lawyer and MP
- Steven Molaro (born 1972), American television producer and writer
- Steven Monroe (born 1972), American actor, comedian, and psychotherapist
- Steven R. Monroe (born 1964), American film director and writer
- Stephen Montague (born 1943), American composer, pianist and conductor
- Stephen Campbell Moore (born 1979), British actor
- Steven Dean Moore, American animation director
- Stephen Morin (1951–1985), American serial killer
- Stephen Morris (disambiguation), multiple people
- Steven Patrick Morrissey (born 1959), English singer, songwriter, and author
- Stephen J. Morse, American law professor
- Stephen Moses (born 1954), American musician
- Stephen Mosher (born 1964), American photographer, writer, and activist
- Steven W. Mosher (born 1948), American social scientist and author
- Stephen Moyer (born 1969), English film and television actor
- Stephen Mulhern (born 1977), English television presenter, magician, comedian, and actor
- Steven Muller (1927–2013), German-American professor, author, and university president
- Steve H. Murdock (1948–2023), American sociologist and government official
- Steven, Steve, or Stephen Murphy (disambiguation), multiple people
- Stephen Martin Myers (born 1963), American former soccer player and convicted criminal

=== N ===
- Steven R. Nagel (1946–2014), American astronaut, aeronautical and mechanical engineer, test pilot, and US Air Force pilot
- Steven Naifeh (born 1952), American author and artist
- Steven Naismith (born 1986), Scottish former footballer and volunteer
- Stephen Nash (disambiguation), multiple people
- Stephen Nedoroscik (born 1998), American artistic gymnast
- Steven Lawayne Nelson (1987–2025), American convicted murderer
- Stephen "Steve" Nemesh (1896–1975), Hungarian-American racecar driver
- Steven Neuberg, American psychology professor, author, and editor
- Stephen Charles New (later Stella Nova; 1960–2010), English guitarist and singer
- Stephen Malcolm Ronald Nice (born 1951), English singer and songwriter
- Stephen Nichols (born 1951), American actor
- Stephen Nichols (born 1963), former Australian rules footballer
- Stephen G. Nichols (born 1936), American professor and medievalist
- Steven Nissen (born 1948), American cardiologist, researcher, and patient advocate
- Stephen Norman, (1918–1946), Austrian Zionist activist and British Army Captain
- Steven Norris (born 1945), British politician and businessman
- Stephen L. Norris, American business executive and former government official
- Stephen Mark Norris (born 1961), English former footballer
- Steven Novella (born 1964), American clinical neurologist, professor, author, and skeptic
- Steven Nzonzi (born 1988), French footballer

=== O ===
- Stephen O'Donnell (born 1983), Scottish footballer
- Stephen O'Donnell (born 1986), Irish professional football coach and former player
- Stephen O'Donnell (born 1992), Scottish professional footballer
- Stephen O'Malley (born 1974), American guitarist, producer, composer, and visual artist
- Stephen Oakley (born 1958), British classicist and academic
- Stephen B. Oates (1936–2021), American history professor and author
- Steven Ogg, Canadian actor
- Steven Ogrizovic (born 1957), English football coach, former footballer and cricketer
- Steven Okert (born 1991), American baseball player
- Steven Old (born 1986), New Zealand footballer
- Steven Oleksy (born 1986), American professional ice hockey player
- Steven Robert Olin (1965–1993), American baseball pitcher
- Steven or Stephen Oliver (disambiguation), multiple people
- Steven Olson (born 1947), American politician, state legislator
- Stephen Omony (born 1980), Ugandan basketball player
- Steven Oo (born 1984), Burmese-American TV personality and fashion designer
- Stephen S. Oswald (born 1951), former pilot and NASA astronaut
- Stephen Otterstrom, American politician

=== P ===
- Stephen B. Packard (1839–1922), American governor of a US state
- Stephen Paddock (1953–2017), American mass murderer and perpetrator of the 2017 Las Vegas shooting
- Steven Page (born 1970), Canadian musician, singer, and songwriter
- Steven Parker (disambiguation), multiple people
- Steven Parrino (1958–2005), American artist and musician
- Steven Pasquale (born 1976), American actor
- Steven Paterson (born 1975), Scottish former politician
- Stephen Paul (born 1951), American woodworker, distiller, and businessman
- Stephen Paulus (1949–2014), American composer
- Stephen Pavlovic (born 1966), Australian music entrepreneur
- Stephen Peace (born 1953), American writer, actor, and producer
- Stephen Pearce (1819–1904), English painter
- Stephen John "Stevo" Pearce (born 1962), British record producer and music executive
- Steven Wayne Pearce (born 1983), American former baseball player
- Stephen Pears (born 1962), English former footballer and coach
- Stephen Peat (1980–2024), Canadian hockey player
- Steven Peikin, American lawyer and SEC official
- Stephen Hyatt Pell (1874–1950), American coin collector and history enthusiast
- Steven Pemberton, researcher in computer science and coding
- Steven James Pemberton (born 1967), British actor, comedian, director, and writer
- Steven Pennings, American biologist and biochemist
- Balasuriyage Steven Perera (1924–1982), Sri Lankan Sinhala, actor, director, and vocalist
- Stephen Perkins (born 1967), American musician and songwriter
- Steven Peros, American playwright, director and screenwriter
- Stephen J. Perry (1954–2010), American writer of cartoons and comic books
- Stephen Joseph Perry (1833–1889), English Jesuit and astronomer
- Stephen R. Perry (born 1950), Canadian legal scholar and professor
- Stephen Samuel Perry (1825–1874), American settler and plantation manager
- Steven Person, American politician
- Stephen Peters (1912–1976), Canadian politician
- Stephen J. "Steve" Peters (born 1963), Canadian politician and business executive
- Stephen Petitpas (born 1957), Canadian wrestler
- Stevan Petrović (1807–1855), Serbian military commander, known as Stevan Knićanin
- Steven Pienaar (born 1982), South African former footballer and coach
- Stephen Rowland Pierce (1896–1966), English architect and town planning consultant
- Steven Pinker (born 1954), American cognitive scientist and popular science author
- Steven Pitt, multiple people
- Stephen Pleasonton (c.1776–1855), American government administrator
- Stephen 'Steve' Poleskie (1938–2019), artist and author
- Stephen Poliakoff (born 1952), British playwright, director and screenwriter
- Steven Poole (born 1972), British author, journalist, and video game theorist
- Steven Earl Popkes (born 1952), American science fiction writer
- Steven "Steve" Porcaro (born 1957), American keyboardist, singer and songwriter, one of the founding members of the rock band Toto
- Stephen Porges (born 1945), American psychiatrist and neuroscientist
- Stephen Port (born 1975), British serial killer
- Stephen Porter, British professor of oral medicine
- Stephen Potts (born 1957), British author and writer
- Steven John Potts (born 1967), English football coach and former player
- Stephen Bosworth Pound (1833–1911), American lawyer, politician, and judge
- Stephen Prina (born 1954), American artist and professor
- Steven Prince, American road manager and actor
- Steven Pruitt (born 1984), Wikipedia editor with the most edits
- Stephen Punt (born 1962), British comedian, writer, and actor
- Stephen Purdon (born 1983), Scottish actor

=== Q ===
- Steven Michael Quezada (born 1963), American actor, comedian and politician

=== R ===
- Stephen Hall Railsback (born 1945), American actor
- Stephen James Randall, Canadian professor, author, and activist
- Stephen John Randall (born 1980), English former cricketer
- Stephen Randolph (born 1974), American baseball player
- Stephen Rannazzisi (born 1977), American actor and stand-up comedian
- Steven Rasmussen, American psychiatrist
- Steven Raucci (born 1948), American convicted criminal
- Stephen Rea (born 1946), Irish actor
- Steven Rea, American journalist, film critic, web producer, and writer
- Stephen M. Reasoner (1944–2004), American former federal judge
- Stephen Rebello, American author, screenwriter, journalist, & former clinical therapist
- Stephen R. Reed (1949–2020), American politician and convicted criminal
- Stephen Lester Reeves (1926–2000), American professional bodybuilder, actor, and philanthropist
- Stephen Regelous, New Zealand computer graphics software engineer
- Stephen Michael Reich (born 1936), American composer
- Steven Reich, American attorney, former DOJ employee, and CEO
- Stephen Rennicks, Irish musician and composer
- Stephen Resnick (1938–2013), American economist and professor
- Steven Reuther (1951–2010), American film producer
- Stephen Reynolds, Canadian television director
- Stephen, Steven, or Steve Rhodes (disambiguation), multiple people
- Stephen Richards, American vocalist and guitarist
- Stephen D. Richards (1856–1879), American serial killer
- Stephen L Richards (1879–1959), American lawyer, professor, and LDS Church leader
- Steven Rifkind (born 1962), American music entrepreneur
- Steven Riley, British professor of infectious disease
- Steven Ritch (1921–1995), American actor
- Stephen E. Rivkin, American film editor, producer, and organizational head
- Steven Roberts, several people
- Steven Robertson (born 1977), Scottish actor
- Stephen C. Robinson (born 1957), American lawyer and former judge
- Steven Robman (born 1944), American TV and theatre director and producer
- Stephen Roche (born 1959), Irish road racing cyclist
- Stephen Roche (born 1964), New Zealand composer and performer
- Steven Clark Rockefeller (born 1936), American philanthropist, professor, and author
- Stephen Rodrick, American journalist
- Steven Rogelberg, American psychologist, professor, author, and editor
- Steven, Stephen or Steve Rogers (disambiguation), several people
- Stephen Root (born 1951), American actor
- Steven Rose (1938–2025), English neuroscientist, author, and social commentator
- Steven Rosefielde (born 1942), American professor and author
- Steven J. Rosen, American political lobbyist
- Steven Rosenbaum, American author, entrepreneur, nonprofit director, and filmmaker
- Steven Rosenberg (born 1940), American physician, cancer researcher, and surgeon
- Steven Rosenblum, American film editor
- Stephen Rosenfeld (1932–2010), American journalist, editor, and columnist
- Steven Rosengard, American fashion designer
- Stephen Roskill (1903–1982), British naval officer, naval historian, and author
- Stephen Ross (disambiguation), multiple people
- Stephen Joseph Rossetti (born 1951), American Catholic priest, author, educator, licensed psychologist
- Steven Rothery (born 1959), English musician
- Steven Richard Rothman (born 1952), American former jurist and politician
- G. Steven Rowe (born 1953), American lawyer, politician, and organizational executive
- Stephen Rubin (born 1937), British businessman
- Steven Rudy (born 1978), American state politician and business owner
- Steven Rumbelow (1949−2016), British theatre and film director and producer

=== S ===
- Stephen Sachs (born 1959), American stage director and playwright
- Stephen H. Sachs (1934–2022), American lawyer and politician
- Stephen Sackur (born 1964), British journalist
- Stephen Sadowski (born 1967), Canadian artist specializing in comics
- Steven Salaita (born 1975), American scholar, author and public speaker
- Steven Sater, American poet, lyricist, playwright, and screenwriter
- Steven Savile (born 1969), British author and editor
- Stephen Schiff, American screenwriter, producer, and journalist
- Steven P. Schinke (1945–2019), American academic
- Steven Ralph Schirripa (born 1957), American actor, producer, author, voice artist, and businessman
- Stephen Edward Schmidt (born 1970), American public relations and political strategist
- Steven J. Schmidt, American political and environmental activist
- Steven A. Schroeder, American professor, editor, and organizational head
- Stephen Schwartz (disambiguation), multiple people with name spelling variations
- Stephen A. Schwarzman (born 1947), American business executive
- Steven Seagal (born 1952), American actor, producer, screenwriter, martial artist, and musician
- Steven Sebring (born 1966), American photographer, filmmaker and producer
- Stephen Seche (born 1952), US ambassador to Yemen
- Stephen Sedgwick, British mix engineer
- Stephen Sedley (born 1939), British lawyer
- Stephen Semel, American filmmaker and actor
- Stephen Senior, Welsh politician
- Stephen Sesnick, club owner and band manager
- Steven Sessegnon (born 2000), English professional footballer
- Steven Severin (born 1955), English songwriter, composer, multi-instrumentalist, and producer
- Stephen H. Shagan (1927–2015), American novelist, screenwriter, and television and film producer
- Steven Shainberg (born 1963), American film director and producer
- Stephen Shames (born 1947), American photojournalist and activist
- Stephen Shaw (born 1953), British prison ombudsman and investigator
- Stephen Shellans Jr. (born 1960), American rower
- Stephen Shellen, or Stephen Shellenberger (born 1957), Canadian actor
- Steven Jay Shelley (born 1962), American drummer
- Stephen Shen (born 1949), Taiwanese politician and previous government official
- Stephen Shenker (born 1953), American theoretical physicist and professor
- Stephen Shennan, British archaeologist and academic
- Stephen Ross Shennan (born 1991), New Zealand rugby player
- Stephen B. Shepard (born 1939), American business journalist and academic
- Stephen Shepherd, Canadian literature professor
- Stephen Shepich (1948–2013), American state politician and convict
- Stephen Lea Sheppard (born 1983), Canadian writer and former actor
- Stephen M. Sheppard (born 1963), American law professor, legal historian, and author
- Stephen A. Shill (born 1957), British filmmaker and actor
- Stephen Shortridge (born 1951), American actor, painter, and author
- Stephen Sidelinger (born 1947), American designer, educator, and book artist
- Stephen de Silva Jayasinghe (1911–1977), Sri Lankan Sinhala politician
- Stephen Louis Silberman (1957–2024), American writer, editor, and podcaster
- Steven Silver (actor) (born 1989), American actor
- Stephen Simpson (1789–1854), American author, journalist, and editor
- Steven Sims (born 1997), American football player
- Stephen Sinclair, New Zealand playwright, screenwriter, and novelist
- Stephen Six (born 1965), American lawyer, former judge, and former state Attorney General
- Steven L. Sles (born 1940), American artist, composer and musician
- Stephen Charles Sloan (1944–2024), American football player and coach
- Stephen Smale (born 1930), American mathematician
- Stephen B. Small (1947–1987), American businessman
- Stephen A. Smith (born 1949), American communications professor, author, part of Whitewater Scandal
- Steven Smith Jr. (born 1945), Canadian actor, writer and comedian
- Steven Paul Smith (1969–2003), American singer-songwriter and musician known as Elliott Smith
- Steven Soderbergh (born 1963), American film director
- Steven Sogge (born 1947), American former football and baseball player
- Steven Soles, American singer-songwriter, record producer, and guitarist
- Steven Solomon (born 1993), Australian sprinter
- Stephen Sommers (born 1962), American film director and screenwriter
- Stephen Sondheim (1930–2021), American theatre composer and lyricist
- Steven Sonntag, American dancer
- Steven Sotloff (1983–2014), American-Israeli journalist
- Stephen Roger Southwood (born 1955), Australian judge
- Steven Souza Jr. (born 1989), American baseball player
- Stephen Speed (born c. 1963), former mayor and retired U.S. Naval officer
- Steven Spence (born 1988), American musician and DJ
- Stephen Spencer, English DJ & producer
- Stephen Spender (1909–1995), English poet, novelist, essayist, and professor
- Steven Spielberg (born 1946), American film director and producer, one of the most popular in film history
- Stephen Spinella (born 1956), American actor
- Stephen Spiro (1939–2007), American political activist
- Stephen C. Spiteri (born 1963), Maltese military historian
- Stephen Sprouse (1953–2004), American fashion designer and artist
- Stephen Orr Spurrier (born 1945), American football player and coach
- Steven Spurrier (1878–1961), British artist
- Steven Spurrier (1941–2021), British wine expert, merchant, and author
- Stephen Squeri (born 1959), American corporate executive and board member
- Stephen Sserubula (born 1981), Ugandan politician
- Steven Stamkos (born 1990), Canadian ice hockey player, captain of Tampa Bay Lightning of the National Hockey League (NHL)
- Steven Stanley (born 1958), Jamaican music producer and musician
- Steven M. Stanley (born 1941), American professor of paleontology and evolutionary biology
- Steven Staples (born 1966), Canadian policy analyst, organizational executive, and writer
- Stephen Starring (1961–2025), American professional football player
- Stephen Staunton (born 1969), Irish football manager and former player
- Steven Stayner (1965–1989), American kidnapping victim
- Stephen "Stepa" Stepanović (1856–1929), Serbian military commander during First Balkan War
- Stephen Owen Stephens (1930–2021), American television broadcaster and producer
- Stephen Stevens (1793–1870), American Justice of the Indiana Supreme Court, abolitionist
- Stephen Arthur Stills (born 1945), American singer, songwriter, and musician
- Steven Stivers (born 1965), American businessman and politician
- Stephen Stohn (born 1948), American-Canadian lawyer, TV producer, & university chancellor
- Stephen Samuel Stratton (1840–1906), English organist and author
- Stephen Strasburg (born 1988), American baseball player
- Stephen E. Straus (1946–2007), American physician, immunologist, virologist, and science administrator
- Stephen B. Streater (born 1965), British technology entrepreneur
- Stephen Street (born 1960), English music producer
- Stephen Stucker (1947–1986), American actor,
- Stephen Sullivan (disambiguation), multiple people
- Stephen Swartz, (born 1991), American electronic-music artist, known mononymously as "Stephen"
- Stephen Sugarman, American law professor
- Stephen Sulyk (1924–2020), Ukrainian-American archbishop
- Steven Kent Summers, American costumer, creative director, & producer
- Steven Sund, American police officer & former US Capitol Police chief
- Stevan Šupljikac (1786–1848), Serbian voivode (military commander) and the first Voivode of the Serbian Vojvodina
- Stephen Susco (born 1974), American screenwriter, producer, and director
- Stephen Susman (1941–2020), American lawyer
- Stephen Swad, American business executive and accountant
- Steven Barry Sykes (1914–1999), British artist of camouglage and ceramics
- Steven Robert Sykes (born 1984), South African rugby player
- Steven Douglas Symms (born 1938), American politician and lobbyist

=== T ===
- Stephen Tashjian (born 1959), American artist, puppeteer, and singer
- Stephen Tennant (1906–1987), British socialite
- Stephen Michael Tensi (1942–2024), American football player
- Stephen Thomas (disambiguation), multiple people
- Steven Thomas (disambiguation), multiple people
- Steven, Stephen or Steve Thompson (disambiguation), multiple people
- Stephen Thorne (1935–2019), British actor
- Stephen Timms (born 1955), British politician
- Stephen Tobin (1836–1905), Canadian merchant and politician
- Stephen A. Tolbert (1921–1975), Liberian politician and businessman
- Stephen Tobolowsky (born 1951), American actor, writer, director, and musician
- Stephen Tompkins (born 1971), American artist, animator, and composer
- Stephen Tompkinson (born 1965), English actor, narrator, & director
- Stephen Tong (born 1940), Chinese-Indonesian pastor, teacher, author, and songwriter
- Stephen Totter (1963–2019), American operatic baritone and horn player
- Stephen Toulmin (1922–2009), British philosopher, author, and educator
- Steven Tsuchida, American film and television director
- Stephen Trask, American composer
- Stephen Travers (born c. 1951), Irish musician
- Steven Truscott (born 1945), Canadian man, wrongly convicted for murder
- Stephen Johnson Turre (born 1948), American jazz musician, composer, arranger, and educator
- Steven Tyler (born 1948), American singer, songwriter, musician, and actor

=== U ===
- Stephen Ucci (born 1971), American politician and Rhode Island state legislator
- Steven F. Udvar-Házy (born 1946), Hungarian-American business executive and philanthropist
- Stephen Ullmann (1914–1976), Hungarian-British linguist and philologist
- Stephen Underwood (born 1975), American drummer
- Steven Ungerleider (1949–2023), American psychologist, author, and producer
- Stephen Unwin (born 1959), English theatre director
- Stephen Updegraff (born 1962), American innovative eye surgeon and organization board member
- Stephen Uppal (born 1978), English actor
- Stephen Urban (born 1952), American local councilmember and former Pennsylvania legislator
- Stephen Urice (born 1950), American lawyer, lecturer, and archeologist
- Stephen H. Urquhart (born 1965), American state politician and religious leader

=== V ===
- Stephen Vaden (born 1982), American federal court judge and former government official
- Steven Siro Vai (born 1960), American guitarist, composer, singer, songwriter, and producer
- Stephen Valiquette (born 1977), Canadian former hockey player and sports analyst
- Steven van de Velde (born 1994), Dutch beach volleyball player
- Steven Van Zandt (born 1950), American musician, singer, songwriter, and actor
- Stephen Vaughn, American lawyer and former US Trade Representative
- Stephen M. Veazey, American religious group leader
- Steven Victor, Haitian-American record executive and artist manager
- Steven Vidler (born 1960), Australian actor
- Steven Vincent (1955–2005), American author and journalist
- Stephen Viscusi, American author, columnist, and broadcast journalist
- Stephen Vitiello, American visual and sound artist, former guitarist
- Steven Vitória (born 1987), Canadian professional soccer player
- Stephen William Vizard (born 1956), Australian TV & radio presenter, producer, writer, and lawyer
- Stephen Isaiah Vladeck (born 1979), American law professor and podcast host
- Stephen Francis Von Till Jr., American musician

=== W ===
- Stephen Waley-Cohen (born 1946), English theatre director and producer
- Stephen or Steve Wallace (disambiguation), multiple people
- Stephen Wallem (born 1968), American actor and singer
- Stephen Martin Walt (born 1955), American professor of international affairs
- Steven T. Walther (born 1943), American attorney and government official
- Stephen Warbeck (born 1953), English composer and director
- Steven Ward (born 1990), Irish professional boxer
- Steven Warner, visual effects supervisor
- Steven Washington Jr. (1948–2004), American serial killer
- Stephen M. Watt, computer scientist, mathematician, researcher working in academia
- Stephen Wayda (born 1946), American professional photographer
- Stephen Webb (disambiguation), multiple people
- Steven Webb (born 1984), English actor
- Steven Weber (born 1961), American actor, voice actor, comedian and singer
- Stephen Webster (born 1959), British jewellery designer
- Stephen W. Webster (born 1943), American attorney, politician, and woodland manager
- Steven Weinberg (1933–2021), American theoretical physicist and author
- Steven Weisberg (born 1960), American film editor
- Steven Weiss (disambiguation), various people
- Steven Weissman (born 1968), American alternative cartoonist
- Stephen C. West (born 1952), British biochemist and molecular biologist
- Stephen Girard Whipple (1823–1895), American 49er, newspaper editor, politician, and Union officer
- Stephen M. White (1853–1901), American politician and US Senator
- Stephen J. Whitfield (born 1942), American professor of American politics, culture, & history
- Stephen Whittle (born 1955), British legal scholar, professor, activist, and organizational executive
- Stephen Wight (born 1980), English actor
- Stephen Wild (born 1981), English rugby footballer
- Stephen Wildman (born 1951), British art history professor
- Steven S. Wildman, American professor, researcher, author, and editor
- Stephen Earl Wilhite (1948–2022), American computer scientist
- Steve Wilks (born 1969), American football coach and former player
- Steven John Wilkos (born 1964), American talk show host and military veteran
- Stephen Williams (disambiguation), several people
- Stephen Wilson (disambiguation), several people
- Steven or Steve Wilson (disambiguation), several people
- Steven Windmueller, American professor of Jewish studies and author
- Stephen Ralph Windom (born 1949), American attorney and state politician
- Stephen Winn (born 1959), English former footballer
- Stephen Winsten (1893–1991), English author
- Steven Winter (legal scholar), American law professor
- Stephen Lawrence Winwood (born 1948), English singer, songwriter, and musician
- Steven or Stephen Wise (disambiguation), multiple people
- Steven Charles Witkoff (born 1957), American Special Envoy to the Middle East in 2025; real estate investor and lawyer
- Steven Woitkun, American politician
- Steven Gene Wold (born 1951), American musician and producer
- Steven D. Wolens (born 1950), former Texas state legislator
- Stephen Wolfram (born 1959), British-American computer scientist and businessman
- Steven Woodrow, American politician
- Stephen Wooldridge (1977–2017), Australian racing cyclist
- Steven Wormald (born 1946), explorer and surveyor of the Antarctic and Arctic
- Stephen Gary Wozniak (born 1950), American programmer and co-founder of Apple Inc.
- Steven Woznick (born 1949), American athlete
- Steven Wright (born 1955), American comedian, actor, writer, and film producer
- Steven Gerald James Wright (born 1958), English serial killer
- Stephen Richard Wright (1954–2024), English radio/TV personality, disc jockey, and author
- Stephen Alan Wynn (born 1942), American real estate businessman
- Steven Lawrence Wynn (born 1960), American singer, songwriter, and musician

=== Y ===
- Stephen Yagman (born 1944), American lawyer
- Stephen Yakubu (born 1966), Ghanaian politician
- Stephen Yang (1911–2007), Sichuanese surgeon, educator, Quaker peace activist
- Stephen Yarwood (born 1971), Australian urban futurist
- Steven Yates (born 1983), New Zealand rugby union player
- Steven Yawson (born 1999), English football player
- Steven Yeun (born 1983), South Korean-American actor
- Steven Youngbauer (born 1950), American lawyer

=== Z ===
- Stephen Zack (born 1992), American basketball player
- Stephen N. Zack (born 1947), American lawyer and former bar president
- Steven James Zahn (born 1967), American actor and comedian
- Steven Zaillian (born 1953), American screenwriter, director, film editor, and producer
- Steven Zalewski (born 1986), American former ice hockey player
- Steven Zaloga (born 1952), American author and defense consultant
- Stephen Zappala Sr. (1932–2021), American state judge
- Stephen Zappala Jr., American politician and attorney
- Stephen Zarlenga (1941–2017), American economics researcher and author
- Stephen Zeh, American basket weaver
- Steven Zelich (born 1961), American convicted murderer and a former police officer
- Steven Zhang (disambiguation), multiple people
- Stephen Ziliak (born 1963), American professor of economics and author
- Stephen Anthony Zimmerman (born 1949), British financier
- Steven C. Zimmerman (born 1957), American chemistry professor and administrator
- Stephen Eric Zimmerman Jr. (born 1996), American basketball player
- Steven Zirnkilton (born 1958), American voice actor and former politician
- Steven Zuber (born 1991), Swiss footballer
- Steven Zucker (1949–2019), American mathematician and educator
- Stephen Edward Zuckerman (born 1947), American television and theater director
- Stephen Zunes (born 1956), American international relations scholar and author

== Fictional characters ==
- Stephen, a house slave in the film Django Unchained played by Samuel L. Jackson
- Stephen, an engine based on Stephenson's Rocket in the TV series Thomas & Friends.
- Steven Crain, a character in the Netflix series The Haunting of Hill House (TV series)
- Stephen Dedalus, a character in the novels A Portrait of the Artist as a Young Man and Ulysses by James Joyce
- Stephen "Steve" Dierks, a pawn shop owner and one of the main characters in the 2020 movie Hocked
- Stephen Falken, a character in the film WarGames
- Steven Fraser, a character in the film Cyberbully
- Steve Haines, a character from Grand Theft Auto V
- Steven Harper, the school principal and protagonist of TV series Boston Public
- Steven "Steve" Harrington, a character in the Netflix series Stranger Things
- Stephen Hawke, titular character in The Crimes of Stephen Hawke
- Stephen Hull, a character in the Stephen King story The Doctor's Case
- Steven Hyde, a character in the TV series That '70s Show
- Steven M. Kovacs, main character in the 1996 film The Cable Guy
- Steven J. Lockjaw, main antagonist in One Battle After Another
- Stephen Maturin, one of the two main characters in the homonymous Aubrey–Maturin series by Patrick O'Brian
- Stephen Nimieri, a refugee character in the 2004 film I Heart Huckabees
- Steven "Steve" Rhoades, a neighbor character in the Married... with Children series
- Steven "Steve" Rogers, also known as Captain America, character appearing in American comic books published by Marvel Comics
- Steven Spence, character from the TV series Gossip Girl
- Stephen Stotch, Butters Stotch’s father on the animated show South Park
- Steven Stone, champion and final boss from the Pokémon games Pokemon Ruby, Sapphire, and Emerald and their 3D remakes Pokémon Omega Ruby and Alpha Sapphire
- Stephen Strange, also known as Doctor Strange, the Sorcerer Supreme in the Marvel Universe
- Steven Taylor, a companion to the first doctor in Doctor Who
- Steven "Steve" Trevor, character in the DC Comics and 1970s television series Wonder Woman
- Dr. Steven Turner, a psychiatrist and father character in the Netflix series Archive 81
- Stephen Wilkins, a character in the film Trick 'r Treat
- Steven Quartz Universe, title character in the animated series Steven Universe
- Steven Yeo, a character in the film I Not Stupid Too

== See also ==
- Steve
- Project Steve
