= Viscusi =

Viscusi is a surname. Notable people with the surname include:

- Joe Viscusi (born 1953), American politician from Florida
- Stephen Viscusi, American author, columnist and broadcast journalist
- W. Kip Viscusi (born 1949), American economist
