= Maria Alejandra Quintanilla =

Musical artist

- Born: Maria Alejandra Quintanilla; Lima, Peru
- Genres: contemporary music, jazz, experimental music, world music, pop music
- Occupation: Transdisciplinary Auteur
- Instrument: Voice
- Website: www.mariaalejandraquintanilla.com

Maria Alejandra Quintanilla (born 11 December) is a transdisciplinary auteur, co-director and recording artist at W&J Productions based in New York City.

== Career ==
Peruvian born and Los Angeles raised, Maria Alejandra Quintanilla began her formal musical studies as a recipient of a Jazz scholarship from the Friends of Jazz Inc.

In 2011, she won the Gold Medal at the International Competition of Choral Singing in Spittal, Austria, as part of the Fullerton Chamber Singers.

In 2013, she began her bachelor's degree in jazz performance at California State University, where she was awarded a scholarship by the Ella Fitzgerald Foundation. She graduated summa cum laude two years ahead of time with the highest honors awarded by the university.

In 2014 she received a DownBeat Music Award as part of Pacific Standard Time (award granted again in 2015 and 2016).

In 2015 Maria moved to New York and began a master's degree in music performance at State University of New York, once again as a scholar of the Ella Fitzgerald Foundation (the first student in the history of this institution to receive this scholarship twice). In the same year, she recorded the first album of duo project Renato Diz | Maria Quintanilla at Daniel Concert Hall in Los Angeles, with multi Estonian Music Awards winning engineer José Diogo Neves, entitled "Distance Chemistry", released on New York-based label W&J Productions.

In 2016 "Distance Chemistry" was released at Rockwood Music Hall, with a sold-out box office. Inspired by Renato Diz | Maria Quintanilla's unique musical approach, film director Pedro Marnoto Pereira invited them to create a short film inspired by their original composition "Conversation II". Later that year, Renato Diz | Maria Quintanilla collaborated with indigenous Taiwanese percussionist Sayun Chang to create their new work. Collectively they composed several chamber pieces inspired by the stories of aboriginal tribes and Taiwanese traditions, this work culminated in an album recording at Tedesco Studios entitled "Breathing Taiwan" (on W&J Productions).

In 2017 Maria Alejandra was endowed the Thayer Fellowship in Arts for Excellence, Creativity and Talent (this exclusive award is given to only 3 individuals amongst 500,000 students from all Colleges of State University Of New York). She also received the Purchase College Outstanding Graduate Student Award and graduated summa cum laude, with the highest honors personally given by the university's president and New York State Senator Chuck Schumer. During her time at SUNY she had the opportunity to represent Ella Fitzgerald in centennial performances with the Purchase Jazz Orchestra at the Blue Note Jazz Club and Jazz at Lincoln Center. After graduating, she was invited to be the Vocal Performance Teaching Artist for the Cultural Immersion Arts Abroad Program at the State University of New York. In the same year she co-wrote and recorded the soundtrack for the documentary "Vozes na Névoa" along with Renato Diz, directed by Pedro Marnoto Pereira. Also, her duo with Renato Diz was commissioned to create a special work honoring the History of Portugal by ARTE Institute, Caixa Geral de Depósitos and Fundação Luso Americana. This creation entitled "Portugal: Sonic Paths and Possibilities" contained compositions and original arrangements that explore the deepest origins of Portugal and its influence and ramifications throughout Africa, South America and Asia. After its world premiere at Joe's Pub, they were invited by Instituto Camões to present this creation at the Festival Portugal International de Montreal in Canada.

In 2018 she performed with Renato Diz trio at one of the most iconic festivals in the world, the Summerstage, in Central Park, where names such as Sonic Youth, Joni Mitchell, Sting, Stevie Wonder and Bobby McFerrin also performed in previous years.

In 2019, Maria and Renato Diz were commissioned by the Portuguese Embassy in Kinshasa and the American Embassy in Kinshasa to perform at the Kinshasa Jazz Festival in the Democratic Republic of the Congo.

Since the beginning of her musical career, she has had the opportunity to perform on some of the most important stages and festivals in Europe, North and South America with names like Jon Faddis, John Benitez, Steve Turre, Tia Fuller, David Kikowski, Kyioshi Kitagawa, Marvin Sewell, Jeff Haynes, Mark Peterson, Steve Gluzband, Melvin Lee Davis, Todd Coolman, John Abercrombie, Pete Malinverni and Ingrid Jensen among many others.

In 2020, Maria Alejandra Quintanilla released two singles as a leader including "Seven Courses" and "Shade of White".

== Discography ==
=== As leader ===
- Irrefragible Laws (2023)
- Shade of White (2020)
- Seven Courses (2020)

=== As co-leader ===
- Breathing Taiwan (2017) – with Renato Diz and Sayun Chang
- Distance Chemistry (2016) – with Renato Diz

=== As guest vocalist ===
- Have You Heard – Pacific Standard Time
- Dazzling Blue – Alexis Cole
- Freedom is a Voice – J-Train
