= Steve Douglas =

Steve Douglas may refer to:

- Steve Douglas (footballer) (1966–), Australian soccer player
- Steve Douglas (musician) (1938–1993), American saxophonist, flautist and clarinetist
- Steve Douglas (skateboarder) (born 1967), professional skateboarder, company owner and industry mogul
- Steve Douglas (sportscaster) (c. 1911–1981), Canadian sportscaster
- Steve Douglas (presenter), son of Eric Morley, founder of the Miss World pageant

== See also ==
- Stephen Douglas (disambiguation)
