= Stephen Ford =

Stephen, Steven or Steve Ford may refer to:

- Stephen Sean Ford (born 1989), American actor
- Steve Ford (footballer) (born 1959), English footballer
- Steve Ford (born 1965), Welsh rugby union player
- Steven Ford (born 1956), American actor, son of President Gerald Ford

== See also ==
- Steven Forde
