= Overton Grange School =

Coordinates: 51.3518°N 0.1970°W

Location
- Stanley Road; Sutton, Surrey, SM2 6TQ; United Kingdom

Information
- School type: Academy Academy Convertor
- Established: 1997
- Department for Education URN: 136756 Tables
- Ofsted: Reports
- Chair of Governors: Simon Doubell
- Headteacher: Chris McNab
- Deputy Headteacher: Charlotte Auger
- Staff: 150
- Years taught: Years 7-13
- Gender: Mixed
- Age: 11 to 18
- Enrolment: 1245
- Houses: 4
- Colour: Green
- Website: overtongrange.sutton.sch.uk

Overton Grange School is a mixed academy school in Sutton, Greater London, England. The school opened in 1997 with its first intake.

Planning for a new school in the area was identified in the 1980s. The capacity is approximately 1300 students. It has a sixth form college, opened in 2002.

It has a hearing support department and a greater number of students with disabilities because of the purpose-built facilities.

The school became an academy on 1 June 2011.

Students are divided into two bands - Overton and Grange - dividing between Grange learning Spanish language and Overton learning French language.

When pupils move onto to KS4 (YEAR 10+11) they are split into bands again; with X and Y band.

Overton Grange School, or 'Overton' as it is more commonly known as, has four house groups: Amber, Emerald, Ruby and Sapphire.

Each form, or tutor group, has between 25 and 30 students, all in one house and all in one band.

Pupils are now issued lanyards based on their year groups after the return to school in 2023; Y7 Green, Y8 Orange, Y9 Blue, Y10 Purple, Y11 Black and Sixth Form pupils have school-branded lanyards which are Y12 yellow, Y13 green or school prefectblue.

The latest OFSTED report, highlights the schools positives. Whilst OFSTED does not give overall grades, the school received Requires Improvement for Quality of Education and Sixth form provision, and good in all other areas. In the 2016 inspection, the school was rated good in all areas.

The School provides 7 Years of Education for all students. Year 12 and 13 are the Sixth form. In order for a student to move into the sixth form, they require sufficient GCSE results from the Year 11 Exams at the end of the year. If they have not achieved these grades, then it will require them to search for another Sixth form for further education.

== Background ==
The school was built on derelict land which once housed a blood transfusion centre and then a youth theatre workshop. The site had originally seen planning for a new prison. The first intake was in September 1997 but it was not until 27 March 1998 that the school was officially opened. Further accommodation was added to support GCSE students in September 2000 and a sixth form was built in September 2002.

== List of Headteachers ==
- Mr. Kieran Osborne (1997–2004)
- Mr Gerry Bennett (2004)
- Mr. Willis (2004–2005)
- Mr. Jones (2005–2006) (Acting)
- Mr. Stephen Foxwell (2006–2008)
- Mr Gerry Bennett and Mr Keith Stride (2009)
- Mr. Peter Butterworth (2009–2016)
- Mr. Gerry Bennett and Mr. Keith Stride (2016–2019)
- Mr. Keith Stride (2019–2022)
- Mr. David Eccles and Miss. Charlotte Auger (2022–2023)
- Miss. Charlotte Auger (2023–2024) (Acting)
- Mr. Chris McNab (2024-
