= Stephen Nash =

Stephen or Steven Nash may refer to:

== Sports ==
- Stephen Nash (rugby league) (born 1986), English rugby league footballer
- Stephen Nash (swimmer) (born 1956), British butterfly swimmer
- Stephen Nash (volleyball) (born 1985), Canadian volleyball player
- Steve Nash (born 1974), Canadian basketball coach and former player
- Steve Nash (rugby league) (born 1949), English rugby league footballer

== Others ==
- Stephen Nash (diplomat) (born 1942), former British Ambassador to Albania, Georgia and Latvia
- Stephen D. Nash (born 1954), English wildlife artist
- Stephen P. Nash (1821–1898), American lawyer
- Steven G. Nash (1938-1991), American politician
- Stephen A. Nash (1924–1959), American serial killer
