= Stephen Marks (economist) =

American economist and Indonesianist

Stephen V. Marks (born 1958) is an American economist who specializes in the economy of Indonesia. He is the Elden Smith Professor of Economics at Pomona College, and the coordinator of the college's International Relations programme.

He is the father of Andrew Marks, and is married to Litha Marks.
