= Stephen Birch (academic) =

British health scientist

Stephen Birch is a British health economist. He joined the University of Queensland in 2018 as Director and Chair of the Centre for Business and Economics of Health.

He was previously a professor in the Department of Health Research Methods, Evidence, and Impact at McMaster University, Canada. He is also a member of McMaster's Centre for Health Economics and Policy Analysis and visiting chair in health economics at the University of Manchester. In 2011, he was jointly ranked as the No. 1 cited health economics researcher in Canada by the World Bank, along with his colleague Amiram Gafni.

Birch was educated at Sheffield University (B.A. in economics), the University of Bath (MSc in fiscal studies), and the University of York (D.Phil. in economics), all in England.
