= Stephen Foxwell =

Educator

Stephen W. Foxwell is a head teacher who has been teaching students for thirty years in schools all over the world including Saudi Arabia, Qatar, Nigeria, the Cayman Islands, and the UK, twelve of which have been spent in senior leadership positions. He was headmaster of the British School of Houston until 18 December 2014. He controversially resigned during the 2008/2009 academic year from headmastership at Overton Grange School after being awarded a £150,000 "golden-goodbye", despite leading the school through the worst exam results it had ever had, along with the attempted billing the school for art purchases from a gallery in Brighton. Foxwell is a Porsche car owner and enthusiast.
