= Stephen Halliwell =

Stephen or Steve Halliwell may refer to:

- Stephen Halliwell (classicist) (born 1953), British classicist and academic
- Steve Halliwell (1946–2023), English actor
- Steve Halliwell (rugby league) (born 1962), English born Australian rugby league footballer
