= Stephen Oliver =

Stephen Oliver or Steven Oliver may refer to:

- Stephen Oliver (actor) (1941–2008), American actor
- Stephen Oliver (bishop) (born 1948), Anglican bishop of Stepney
- Stephen Oliver (composer) (1950–1992), British composer
- Stephen Oliver (judge) (1938–2024), British civil servant and KC
- Stephen Oliver (Jr), pseudonym of author William Andrew Chatto (1799–1864)
- Stephen Oliver (scientist) (born 1949), professor at the University of Cambridge
- Steve Oliver (born 1962), American musician
- Steven Oliver (footballer) (born 1971), Australian footballer
- Steven Oliver (Australian actor), Indigenous Australian actor/writer, known for Black Comedy
