= Steven Raucci =

American convicted criminal

- Born: August 29, 1948 (age 78)
- Occupation: Facilities Manager
- Years active: 1993-2009
- Employer: Schenectady City School District
- Status: Incarcerated
- Penalty: 23 years to life in prison

Details
- Country: United States
- State: New York
- Killed: 0
- Injured: 0
- Weapon: explosive devices
- Date apprehended: February 20, 2009
- Imprisoned at: Clinton Correctional Facility

Steven Raucci (born August 29, 1948) is an American convicted criminal.

== Early life and career ==
He supervised the Schenectady City School District custodians and was the local Civil Service Employees Association leader. Several employees complained to school and union officials about Raucci's "on-the-job rage," but no action was taken. While working for the district, Raucci resided in Niskayuna, New York. In April 2008, a civil case was filed by Barbara Tidball, who alleged that the Schenectady City School district and the City of Schenectady, grounded upon alleged sexual harassment by Steven Raucci. Tidball asserted that the school district was liable because it knew of Raucci's conduct through her own reports to defendant's administration. The case was decided in 2014.

== Crimes ==
Raucci began his crimes in 1993. No one was injured in any of Raucci's crimes. On Nov. 30, 2006 Raucci left an explosive on the windshield of a vehicle in Clifton Park, New York, outside the home of the Schenectady High School athletic director Gary DiNola.

After matching DNA on an undetonated explosive to saliva on a fork Raucci used at a local diner, Raucci was arrested on February 20, 2009.

=== Legal proceedings ===
Raucci was charged with 23 counts of criminal activity over the course of seventeen years and in three New York Counties. Schenectady County District Attorney Robert M. Carney was the prosecutor for the trial and Raucci was represented by defense attorney Ronald DeAngelus. In 2009, Raucci filed a motion to suppress certain newspaper articles confiscated from his briefcase in his school office and a remark acknowledging that he was aware of the indictment when asked by a Schodack police officer if he wanted to read it. Judge Polly Hoye denied the motion. During the trial, Hoye threw out one of the charges brought against Raucci. Throughout the trial, 200 pieces of evidence were introduced. The prosecution called sixty-two witnesses and the defense called two witnesses. The jury deliberated for four days, and on March 31, 2010, Raucci was convicted on 18 of 21 counts, including arson, conspiracy, and weapons possession. In June 2010, he was sentenced to 23 years to life in prison. The jury found that Raucci committed first degree arson when he placed an explosive device on an occupied home in Rotterdam, New York, which Raucci denies. The jury acquitted him on one count of terrorism, one count of arson, and two counts of criminal mischief.

Following Raucci's conviction, a civil case was filed against the Schenectady City School District by Deborah Gray and others. The plaintiffs alleged that Raucci and the Schenectady City School District caused the intentional infliction of emotional distress and that the school district had negligently supervised and negligently retained Raucci as an employee.

In 2013, the mid-level Appellate Division of the State Supreme Court ruled that Raucci qualifies for a $5,789 monthly pension, which his wife uses to "live comfortably." The court upheld Raucci's convictions. In the appeals proceeding, Raucci was represented by Alan Pierce and argued that his trial attorney, Ronald DeAngelus, was ineffective and his prison sentence is harsh and excessive. The court found that DeAngelus "effectively cross-examined witnesses and presented a coherent defense." Justice John Egan Jr., stated that the preponderance of evidence that Raucci had a harmful effect on people who lived and worked in Schenectady County and other counties outweighed any harmless errors made by the county court. In 2014, the New York Court of Appeals refused to hear Raucci's case.

In 2016, Raucci filed a case in federal court asking the court to review previous decision. Raucci will be eligible for a hearing before a state parole board in October 2031.

=== Detention ===
Raucci is detained at the Clinton Correctional Facility, a maximum-security prison. He works as a porter.

=== Confession ===
In February 2019, Raucci told the Times Union that "he placed a powerful explosive on the sport utility vehicle of then-Schenectady High School athletic director Gary DiNola; vandalized the home of Laura Balogh, a friend's ex-girlfriend; and poured paint on a vehicle owned by Harold Gray, a onetime friend." Raucci denied involvement in an explosion at the home of Stephen and Colleen Capitummino in Rotterdam, New York. Alan Pierce, Raucci's attorney, said that Raucci wanted to confess but that Pierce advised against it while Raucci pursued appeals.

== Personal life ==
Raucci is married. In 2018, Raucci was diagnosed with prostate cancer.

== In popular culture ==
Sarah Koenig produced an NPR radio show about Raucci for This American Life in 2010.

In 2017, John McNamara received the rights to make a television series about Raucci after he contacted Koenig, who had produced the NPR radio show.
