= Stephen Delancey (disambiguation) =

Stephen Delancey (1663–1741) was a notable inhabitant of the New York Colony in the 17th and 18th centuries.

Stephen Delancey (or De Lancey or DeLancey) is also the name of:

- Stephen De Lancey (1738–1809), political figure in New York and Nova Scotia
- Stephen Delancey (born 1748) (1748–1798), chief justice of the Bahamas
