= Stephen Elliott =

Stephen Elliott may refer to:

== Entertainment ==
- Stephen Elliott (actor), (1918–2005), American actor
- Stephen Elliott (author) (born 1971), American author and activist

== Sport ==
- Steve Elliott (footballer, born 1958), English footballer
- Steve Elliott (footballer, born 1978), English footballer
- Stephen Elliott (footballer) (born 1984), Irish international footballer

== Other people ==
- Stephen Elliott Jr. (1830–1866), Confederate general of the American Civil War
- Stephen Elliott (bishop) (1806–1866), 37th Bishop of the Protestant Episcopal Church in the United States
- Stephen Elliott (botanist) (1771–1830), American legislator, banker, educator and botanist

== Fictional characters ==
- Steve Elliot, a character played by Mark Monero in the BBC soap opera EastEnders

== See also ==
- Stephan Elliott (born 1964), Australian film director and screenwriter
- Stephen Elyot (died c.1395), English MP and mayor
- Steven Elliott, Australian wheelchair basketball player
