= Steve Hadley =

Steve Hadley may refer to:

- Stephen Hadley (born 1947), U.S. government official
- Steve Hadley (musician), Australian musician
