= Steve Rogers (disambiguation) =

Steve Rogers is the secret identity of the character Captain America.

Steve, Steven, or Stephen Rogers may also refer to:

- Steve Rogers (Marvel Cinematic Universe), a character in the Marvel Cinematic Universe
- Stephen H. Rogers (born 1930), American ambassador
- Stephen Rogers (politician) (born 1942), Canadian politician
- Steve Rogers (baseball) (born 1949), American Major League baseball player
- Steve Rogers (American football) (born 1953), American football player
- Steve Rogers (rugby league) (1954–2006), Australian rugby league footballer and administrator
- Steven S. Rogers (born c. 1959), founder of the Ebony Experiment
- Steve Rogers (basketball) (born 1968), American basketball player
- Steven Rogers (screenwriter) (fl. 1990s–2010s), American screenwriter
