= Stephen Wise =

Stephen Wise may refer to:

- Stephen Samuel Wise (1874–1949), American rabbi and Zionist leader
- Stephen Wise (politician) (born 1941), member of the Florida Senate

== See also ==
- Steven M. Wise (born 1952), American legal scholar
