= Stephen Nash (volleyball) =

Canadian volleyball player

Personal information
- Nationality: Canadian
- Born: July 5, 1985 (age 41); Calgary, Alberta
- Height: 2.05 cm (1 in)
- Spike: 350 cm (138 in)
- Block: 330 cm (130 in)

Volleyball information
- Position: Opposite

Career
Years	Teams
2003-2007; 2007-2009; 2009-2010; 2010; 2011; 2012; 2012-2013; 2014; 2014-2015; 2016; 2016-2017	(Canada) Trinity Western University (Canada) Briercrest College and Seminary (Sweden) Örkelljunga VK (Qatar) El Entag El Harby VC (Italy) Pallavolo Mantova (Estonia) Pärnu VK (France) Stade Poitevin Poitiers (Sweden) Hylte VBK (Austria) SK Posojilnica Aich/Dob (Indonesia) Jakarta Pertamina Energi (Greece) A.C. Orestias

Stephen Nash (born July 5, 1985) is a Canadian volleyball player.

== Sporting achievements ==
Swedish Championship:

- 2010, 2014

Baltic League:

- 2012

Estonian Championship:

- 2012

MEVZA:

- 2015

Austrian Championship:

- 2015
