= Stephen Hackett =

Stephen Hackett may refer to:

- Stephen Hackett (hurler) (1891–?), Irish hurler
- Steve Hackett (born 1950), English musician, songwriter, singer and producer
- Steven C. Hackett (born 1960), American economist
