= Steve Hall =

Steve, Steven or Stephen Hall may refer to:

== Sports ==
- Steve Hall (Canadian football) (born 1960), Canadian football player
- Steven Hall (rugby union) (born 1972), French rugby union player
- Steve Hall (rugby league) (born 1979), English rugby league player
- Steve Hall (American football) (born 1973), American football player
- Steven Hall (soccer) (born 2005), Australian soccer player

== Politics and government ==
- Steve Hall (politician) (born 1956), member of the Tennessee House of Representatives
- Stephen Hall (politician) (1941–2014), American police officer, realtor and politician
- Steve Clark Hall (born 1953), retired United States Navy submarine officer and documentary film maker
- Stephen Holmes (CIA), CIA officer who used Steven Hall as alias
- Stephen Hall (judge), justice with the Supreme Court of Western Australia

== Other ==
- Stephen Hall (born 1968), Irish artist
- Stephen G. Hall (born 1953), British economist and academic
- Steven Ray Hall (born 1959), American professor of aeronautics and astronautics
- Stephen Hall (actor) (born 1969), Australian actor and writer
- Steven Hall (author) (born 1975), British novelist
- Steve Hall (1954–2018), American musician and comedian; voice of the puppet Shotgun Red
- Nirosta Steel (born 1957), stage name of Scottish-American musician Steven Hall

== See also ==
- Stephen Hall House, a historic house in Reading, Massachusetts
- Stephen King-Hall (1893–1966), British journalist, politician and playwright
- Hall (surname)
