= Steven Washington =

American serial killer (1948–2004)

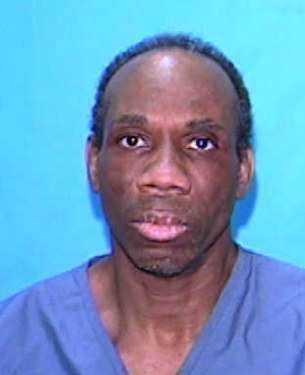
- Inmate mugshot
- Born: Steven Washington Jr. July 27, 1948; St Petersburg, Florida, U.S.
- Died: March 18, 2004 (aged 55); Florida, U.S.
- Other name: Window-Screen Rapist
- Convictions: First degree murder (3 counts); Burglary (4 counts)
- Penalty: Life imprisonment

Details
- Victims: 3
- Span of crimes: August – December 1963
- Country: United States
- State: Florida
- Date apprehended: January 3, 1964

Steven Washington Jr. (July 27, 1948 – March 18, 2004) was an American serial killer who was sentenced to life in prison for the murders of three elderly women in St. Petersburg, Florida. Dubbed the Window-Screen Rapist by the press, Washington's crimes were committed between August and December 1963 when he was only 15 years old, which makes him one of the youngest serial killers in history. He died in prison in 2004.

== Biography ==
Steven Washington Jr. was born in St. Petersburg on July 27, 1948. Little is known about his upbringing, but in October 1963, due to Florida's child marriage laws, he married a 15-year-old girl named Gwendolyn, with whom he fathered one daughter.

=== Murders ===
- On August 28, 1963, Washington attacked a 52-year-old woman during a home invasion. He choked, sexually assaulted, and beat her, but ultimately decided not to kill her. Six days later he broke into the home of a 72-year-old woman. As he did before, he raped and beat her, and left without killing her. The two women reported their attacks, and one described her attacker as a black man who had a grin on his face while raping her.
- On September 25, Washington invaded a third home, this time belonging to 75-year-old Austria native Mary Pawliw, by climbing through an open window. He sexually assaulted, beat, choked, and strangled her to death. Washington strangled Pawliw with such force that a bone was broken in her neck. The next day, neighbors became concerned after not hearing from Pawliw all day, and they called police to recommend a well-visit. Police arrived and found her slightly decomposed body lying in her bed.
- On October 20, Washington strangled 67-year-old Oleeta Lavina Beard McWaters to death. Her body was found the next day. Although she was confirmed to have been strangled, authorities could not rule if she had been raped due to the decomposition on the body. By the time of this killing, authorities began to investigate if the attacks were committed by the same person.
- On December 30, Washington entered the home of 80-year-old Eva Miller by climbing through an open window. As he had done prior, he raped, beat, and strangled Miller to death. Neighbors called police shortly after reporting hearing Miller crying. The next day, her body was found. By this attack, police had already come to the conclusion that all of the attacks were related, and one newspaper, The Tampa Tribune, nicknamed the attacker the "window-screen rapist/murderer".

=== Aftermath ===
At each crime scene, Washington left his fingerprints, usually on the windows he had climbed through. Due to this, he was arrested on January 3, 1964, and charged with the killings. Not long after, he confessed, though claimed he was suffering from insanity. In November, Washington pleaded guilty to the murders, and the following month was sentenced to serve three life sentences. In 1969, he was denied a retrial. In 1970, Washington attempted to appeal his convictions through a federal court. However, the Fifth U.S. Circuit Court of Appeals denied reviewing his case.

On March 18, 2004, Washington died at age 55.

== See also ==
- List of serial killers in the United States
- List of youngest killers
