= Stephen Langdon =

Stephen, Steven or Steve Langdon may refer to:

- Stephen Herbert Langdon (1876–1937), American-born British Assyriologist
- Steven W. Langdon (born 1946), Canadian politician and economist
- Steve J. Langdon (born 1948), American anthropologist
- Steve Langdon (ice hockey) (born 1953), Canadian former ice-hockey player with the Boston Bruins
- Stephen Langdon, the Abbot of Tavistock in 1362

== See also ==
- Stephen Langton (c. 1150 – 1228), English Cardinal of the Roman Catholic Church and Archbishop of Canterbury
