= Steven Woitkun =

American politician

Member of New Hampshire House of Representatives for Rockingham 12
- In office 2016 – December 4, 2018
- Succeeded by: Josh Yokela

Member of New Hampshire House of Representatives for Rockingham 33
- In office 2014–2016

Personal details
- Party: Republican

Steven J. Woitkun is an American politician. He was a member of the New Hampshire House of Representatives from 2014 to 2018.
