= Socrates and Stephen =

Christian martyrs

Saint Socrates and Stephen
- Venerated in: Eastern Orthodox Church; Roman Catholic Church
- Feast: 17 September

Socrates and Stephen (both died circa 307) are a pair of Christian martyrs. Their feast day is 17 September.

They are recorded in certain martyrologies as having been martyred in Britain during the persecution of Diocletian, which took place from 303 to 311. With Saint Alban and Saints Julius and Aaron, they are the only victims registered in the Martyrologies as British.

Tradition puts the scene of the martyrdom of Saints Socrates and Stephen in South Wales. But this is very uncertain. It has been conjectured by some that what may have happened was that "in Britannia" was mistakenly written for "in Bithynia".
