= Steven Finn (disambiguation) =

Steven Finn (born 1989) is an England cricketer.

Steven Finn or Steve Finn may also refer to:

- Steven Finn (ice hockey) (born 1966), former Canadian NHL player
- Steve Finn, character from the novel Lost Souls
