= Stephen Lushington =

Stephen Lushington may refer to:

- Sir Stephen Lushington, 1st Baronet (1744–1807), MP, Chairman of the British East India Company
- Stephen Lushington (judge) (1782–1873), MP, leading advocate of the abolition of slavery and Judge of the Admiralty Court
- Stephen Lushington (Royal Navy officer) (1803–1877), commander of the British naval brigade at Sebastopol in 1854
- Stephen Rumbold Lushington (1776–1868), MP, Governor of Madras 1827–1835
