= Stephen Irwin =

Steve Irwin (1962–2006) was an Australian wildlife expert and television personality.

Stephen Irwin or Steve Irwin may refer to:

- Stephen Irwin (architect) (1944–2019), Canadian architect
- Steve Irwin (attorney) (born 1959), American attorney and politician
- Stephen Irwin (judge) (born 1953), Lord Justice of Appeal
- Stephen M. Irwin (born 1966), Australian novelist and filmmaker
- Steve Irwin (curler) (born 1982), Canadian curler
- Steve Irwin (rugby league) (born 1983), Australian rugby league player
- Steven Irwin (born 1990), English footballer
- Stephen Irwin (fl. 1990s–2010s), Ulster Defence Association member and perpetrator of the Greysteel massacre
- MY Steve Irwin, flagship of the Sea Shepherd Conservation Society

== See also ==
- Steve Erwin (1960–2023), American comic book artist
