= Stephen Gorard =

British academic (born 1957)

Professor Stephen Gorard
- Born: Professor Stephen A. C. Gorard; October 28, 1957
- Education: University of Wales, Cardiff (PhD)
- Scientific career
- Fields: Sociology of education
- Workplaces: Durham University; University of Birmingham
- Thesis: School choice in an established market : families and fee-paying schools in South Wales. (1996)
- Website: www.durham.ac.uk/staff/s-a-c-gorard/

Stephen A. C. Gorard is a British academic who specialises in the sociology of education. Until the summer of 2026, he was Professor of Education and Public Policy at Durham University. Stephen Gorard is the most published and cited UK author in education, and in the top ten academic journals worldwide.

== Family background ==
His mother was Barbara Kathleen Hampton. His mother attended Notting Hill and Ealing High School, and lived at 47 King Edward Gardens, and ran the local Guide pack, of the 1st Ealing Girl Guides. His parents lived in the same area of West Ealing. His maternal grandfather was the deputy borough engineer of Acton. His father attended Ealing County School.

His father, Anthony John Gorard, of 114 Cleveland Road, Ealing, married on Saturday 1 May 1954 at St Stephen's Church, Ealing. His parents moved to Fetcham in Surrey.

Tony Gorard, born 1927, helped to start Anglia Television, joining HTV in August 1967 as Managing Director. HTV took over from Television Wales and the West on 4 March 1968. His father resigned in January 1978, being replaced by Ron Wordley.

His family had lived on Unthank Road in Norwich. William Gorard, Tony's brother, worked for GKN Foundations. Tony Gorard was chief executive of CBC from 1980. The family lived at 'The Beeches' in Chew Magna with four children, then 'Chew Hill House'.

His sister Elizabeth was born in 1964 in Norwich; Heather was born in 1962 in Norwich, and died in 2016 in Hereford; and Rowena was born in 1956 in Ealing, and married in 1980 at St Andrew's Church, Chew Magna.

His father died aged 93 on 14 November 2020.

== Early life ==
He was born in 1957 in Barnet. On 14 September 1976 he had a motorbike accident on Tower Road South in Warmley, being taken to hospital.

== Education ==
Gorard studied Psychology at UCL, and also gained a PGCE in Mathematics.

At Cardiff University he was awarded a PhD in 1996 for research into private and private (fee-paying) schools in Wales.

== Career and research ==
From September 1980, he was a secondary school teacher and head of department, teaching computing, maths and philosophy.

Gorard started his academic career in 1997, having been a secondary school teacher and leader, adult educator, computer analyst, and PhD student at Cardiff. He is Professor of Education and Public Policy, and Fellow of the Wolfson Research Institute, at Durham University.

His research has been funded by bodies including the Economic and Social Research Council (ESRC), Joseph Rowntree Foundation, Brookings Institution, Higher Education Funding Council for England (HEFCE), Qualifications and Curriculum Development Agency (QCA), the Welsh Assembly, and the Education Endowment Foundation (EEF).

Gorard has given written and verbal evidence to various parliamentary select committees. He has contributed regularly stories and articles to all forms the media. including Times Educational Supplement. Gorard has been granted the title of Fellow of the Academy of Social Sciences. The British Educational Research Association (BERA) has included his work as one of the landmark studies that have had a significant impact on British educational policy and teaching practices. He has also been a member of the ESRC Grant Assessment Panel for Education, and a Fellow of the Royal Society of Arts.

He is the author of over 1,000 books, articles and chapters, and his work on educational inequality forms part of the A level Sociology syllabus.

=== Publications ===
His book publications include:

- Gorard, S. and Siddiqui, N. (Eds) (2024) An International Approach to Developing Early Career Researchers, Abingdon: Routledge, ISBN 978-1-032-59280-0(hardback), 978-1-032-59520-7 (paperback), 978-1-003-45506-6 (e-book)
- Gorard, S., See BH, and Siddiqui, N. (2022) Making schools better for disadvantaged students, Abingdon: Routledge, Making Schools Better for Disadvantaged Students | The International I (taylorfrancis.com), ISBN 978-1-032-23137-2 (hardback), 978-1-032-26249-9 (paperback)
- Siddiqui, N. and Gorard, S. (Eds) (2022) Making your doctoral research project ambitious: Developing large-scale studies with real-world impact, Abingdon: Routledge, ISBN 978-1-032-05975-4 (hardback), 978-1-032-06245-7 (paperback), 978-1-003-20136-6 (ebook)
- Gorard, S. (2021) How to make sense of statistics: Everything you need to know about using numbers in social science, London: SAGE, ISBN hardback 978-1-5264-1381-9, paperback 978-1-5264-1382-6, ebook 978-1-5297-5586-2
- Gorard, S. (2020 Ed.) Getting evidence into education: Evaluating the routes to policy and practice, London: Routledge, ISBN hardback 978-0-367-25880-1, paperback 978-0-367-25883-2, ebook 978-0-429-29034-3
- Gorard, S. (2018) Education policy: Evidence of equity and effectiveness, Bristol: Policy Press, ISBN 978-1447342151, 224 pages
- Gorard, S., See, BH and Siddiqui, N. (2017) The trials of evidence-based education, London: Routledge, ISBN 978-1-138-20966-4, 200 pages
- Gorard, S. and See, BH. (2013) Overcoming disadvantage in education, London: Routledge, ISBN 978-0-415-53689-9, 224 pages
- Gorard, S. (2013) Research Design: Robust approaches for the social sciences, London:SAGE, ISBN 978-1-4462-4902-4, 218 pages
- Gorard, S. and Smith, E. (2010) Equity in Education: an international comparison of pupil perspectives, London: Palgrave, ISBN 978-0-230-23025-5, 256 pages
- Gorard, S. (2008, Ed.) Quantitative research in education: Volumes 1 to 3, London: Sage, ISBN 978-1-84787-327-9, 1264 pages
- Gorard, S., with Adnett, N., May, H., Slack, K., Smith, E. and Thomas, L. (2007) Overcoming barriers to HE, Stoke-on-Trent: Trentham Books, ISBN 978-1-85856-414-2 (paperback), 190 pages
- Gorard, S., See, BH., Smith, E. and White, P. (2006) Teacher supply: the key issues, London: Continuum, ISBN 0-8264-8770-X (hardback), 194 pages
- Gorard, S. (2006) Using everyday numbers effectively in research: Not a book about statistics, London: Continuum, ISBN 0-8264-8830-7 (paperback), 94 pages
- Selwyn, N., Gorard, S. and Furlong, J. (2006) Adult learning in the digital age, London: RoutledgeFalmer, ISBN 0-415-35699-7 (paperback), ISBN 0-415-35698-9 (hardback), 229 pages
- Gorard, S., with Taylor, C. (2004) Combining methods in educational and social research, London: Open University Press, ISBN 0-335-21307-3 (paperback), ISBN 0-335-21308-1 (hardback), 198 pages
- Gorard, S., Taylor, C. and Fitz, J. (2003) Schools, Markets and Choice Policies, London: RoutledgeFalmer, ISBN 0-415-30423-7 (paperback), ISBN 0-415-30422-9 (hardback), 226 pages
- Gorard, S. (2003) Quantitative methods in social science: the role of numbers made easy, London: Continuum, ISBN 0-8264-6586-2 (paperback), ISBN 0-8264-6587-0 (hardback), 252 pages
- Gorard, S. and Rees, G. (2002) Creating a learning society?, Bristol: Policy Press, ISBN 1-86134-286-1 (paperback), ISBN 1-86134-393-0 (hardback), 192 pages
- Gorard, S. and Selwyn, N. (2002) Information Technology, New York: McGraw Hill, ISBN 0-07-139667-5, 112 pages
- Selwyn, N. and Gorard, S. (2002) The information age: technology, learning and social exclusion in Wales, Cardiff: University of Wales Press, ISBN 0-7083-1708-1, 226 pages
- Gorard, S. (2001) Quantitative Methods in Educational Research: The role of numbers made easy, London: Continuum, ISBN 0-8264-5307-4 (paperback), ISBN 0-8264-5306-6 (hardback), 200 pages
- Gorard, S. and Selwyn, N. (2001) Information Technology, London: Hodder and Stoughton, ISBN 0-340-80437-8, 104 pages
- Gorard, S. (2000) Education and Social Justice, Cardiff: University of Wales Press, ISBN 0-7083-1619-0, 242 pages
- Gorard, S. (1997) School Choice in an Established Market, Aldershot: Ashgate, ISBN 1-84014-106-9, 271 pages

His journal articles include:

- Gorard, S., Siddiqui, N., See, BH and Gao, Y. (2025) Do school exclusions and attainment outcomes disproportionately impact pupils from ethnic origins? Analysis of pupil characteristics, segregation, and outcomes in England, Education Sciences, 15, 1
- Smith, E., Gorard, S., Morris, R., Perry, T. and Pilgrim-Brown, J. (2025) Then and now: Twenty years of Education research methods use in the UK, British Educational Research Journal, Then and now: Twenty years of education research methods use in the United Kingdom - Smith - British Educational Research Journal - Wiley Online Library
- Gorard, S., Ledger, M., See, BH and Morris, R. (2024) What are the key predictors of international teacher shortages?, Research Papers in Education, doi:10.1080/02671522.2024.2414427
- See, BH, Gorard, S., Gao, Y.Y., Hitt, L., Demie, F., Tereshchenko. A., Siddiqui,, N. & El Soufi, N. (2024). Factors related to the recruitment and retention of ethnic minority teachers: What are the barriers and facilitators? Review of Education. doi:10.1002/rev3.70005
- Gorard, S., Ventista, O., Morris, R. and See, B. (2021) Who wants to be a teacher? Findings from a survey of undergraduates in England, Educational Studies, doi:10.1080/03055698.2021.1915751
- Gorard, S., Siddiqui, N. and See, BH (2021) Assessing the impact of Pupil Premium funding on primary school segregation and attainment, Research Papers in Education, doi:10.1080/02671522.2021.1907775
- See, BH, Gorard, S., Siddiqui, N., El Soufi, N., Lu, B. and Dong, L. (2021) A systematic review of technology-mediated parental engagement on student outcomes, Educational Research and Evaluation, Full article: A systematic review of the impact of technology-mediated parental engagement on student outcomes (tandfonline.com)
- See, BH, Gorard, S., Lu, B., Dong, L. and Siddiqui, N. (2021) Is technology always helpful?: A critical review of the use of education technology in supporting formative assessment in schools, Research Papers in Education, doi:10.1080/02671522.2021.1907778
- See, BH, Morris, R., Gorard, S. and El Soufi, N. (2021) Recruiting and retaining teachers: what works? Researching Education, 2, 1, doi:10.5281/zenodo.4550903
- Boliver, V., Gorard, S. and Siddiqui, N. (2021) Using contextual data to widen access to higher education, Perspectives: Policy and Practice in Higher Education, 25, 1, 7-13, doi:10.1080/13603108.2019.1678076
- Zelinsky, T., Gorard, S. and Siddiqui, N. (2021) Increasing understanding of the aspirations and expectations of Roma students, British Journal of Sociology of Education, 42, 4, 588-606 doi:10.1080/01425692.2021.1872366
- Gorard, S. (2020) Handling missing data in numeric analyses, International Journal of Social Research Methods, 23, 6, 651-660, doi:10.1080/13645579.2020.1729974
- Gorard, S., See, BH and Siddiqui, N. (2020) What is the evidence on the best way to get evidence into use in education?, Review of Education, doi:10.1002/REV3.3200
- Gorard, S., Siddiqui, N. and See, BH (2019) The difficulties of judging what difference the Pupil Premium has made to school intakes and outcomes in England, Research Papers in Education, doi:10.1080/02671522.2019.1677759
- Gorard, S. and Siddiqui, N. (2019) How trajectories of disadvantage help explain school attainment, SAGE Open, doi:10.1177/2158244018825171
- Gorard, S., Boliver, V., Siddiqui, N. and Banerjee, P. (2019) Which are the most suitable contextual indicators for use in widening participation to HE?, Research Papers in Education, 34, 1, 99-129, doi:10.1080/02671522.2017.1402083
- Gorard, S. and Siddiqui, N. (2018) Grammar schools in England: a new analysis of social segregation and academic outcomes, British Journal of Sociology of Education, 39, 7, 909-924, doi:10.1080/01425692.2018.1443432
