= Steve Rhodes (disambiguation) =

Steve Rhodes (born 1964) is an English cricketer.

Steve or Stephen or Steven Rhodes may also refer to:

- Steve Rhodes (journalist), American journalist
- Steve Rhodes (American football) (born 1957), American football player
- Stephen Rhodes (radio presenter) (1951–2017), British radio presenter since the 1970s
- Stephen Rhodes (racing driver) (born 1984), American stock car racing driver
- Stephen G. Rhodes (born 1977), American multimedia artist
- Stephen H. Rhodes (1825–1909), American businessman and politician who served in the Massachusetts Senate
- Steve Rhodes (musician), Nigerian broadcaster and musician
- Steven W. Rhodes, American judge who presided over the 2013 Detroit bankruptcy case

== See also ==
- Steve Rhoades, character on Married... with Children
