= Stephen Higgins (disambiguation) =

Stephen Higgins (born 1938) is the American director of the Bureau of Alcohol, Tobacco and Firearms, 1983–1993.

Stephen Higgins may also refer to:

- Stephen Higgins (conductor), British conductor, accompanist, arranger, and presenter
- Stephen Higgins, runner up of The Apprentice Irish TV series in 2009
- Steve Higgins (born 1963), American writer, producer, announcer, actor, and comedian
