= Stephen Adye =

Stephen Adye may refer to:

- Stephen Galway Adye (1772–1838), British Army officer
- Stephen Payne Adye (c. 1740–1794), British Army officer
