= Stephen Miles =

Stephen Miles or Steven Miles may refer to:

- Stephen A. Miles (born 1967), author and consultant
- Stephen Boyd Miles (1822–1898), frontiersman, stagecoach magnate, cattle rancher, banker and philanthropist
- Steven Miles (born 1977), Australian politician
- Steven H. Miles, American medical doctor and author
