= Stephen Lambert =

Stephen Lambert may refer to:

- Stephen Lambert (field hockey) (born 1979), Australian field hockey goalkeeper
- Stephen Lambert (media executive) (born 1959), British media executive
- Stephen Lambert (editor), American TV editor

== See also ==
- Steve Lambert (born 1976), American artist
