= Steve Thompson =

Steve, Steven or Stephen Thompson (or Thomson) may refer to:

== Sportspeople ==
=== Association football ===
- Stephen Thompson (football chairman) (born 1965/1966), chairman of Scottish football club Dundee United
- Steve Thompson (footballer, born 1955) (1955–2025), English-born football defender and manager, who played for Lincoln City and Charlton Athletic
- Steve Thompson (footballer, born 1963), English-born footballer with Bristol City and Wycombe, and player and manager with Yeovil
- Steve Thompson (footballer, born 1964), English-born footballer who played for Bolton Wanderers and Leicester
- Steve Thompson (footballer, born 1972), English footballer for Gillingham
- Steve Thompson (footballer, born 1989), English-born footballer who played for Port Vale
- Steven Thompson (Scottish footballer) (born 1978), Scottish footballer and pundit, who played for Dundee United, Rangers, Cardiff City, Burnley and St. Mirren.
- Steven Thomson (born 1978), Scottish footballer, currently at Dover Athletic

=== Other sports ===
- Stephen Thompson (fighter) (born 1983), American MMA fighter
- Steve Thompson (rugby union) (born 1978), English rugby union player
- Stephen Thompson (basketball) (born 1968), American basketball coach and former player
- Stevie Thompson (born 1997), American basketball player
- Steve Thompson (defensive tackle, born 1945), American football defensive tackle
- Steve Thompson (defensive tackle, born 1965) (1965–2016), American football defensive tackle

== Other people ==
- Stephen W. Thompson (1894–1977), American aviator of World War I
- Steve Thompson (musician), American record producer and mixer
- Steve Thompson (songwriter) (born 1952), British musician, songwriter and record producer
- Stephen Thompson (journalist) (born 1972), American music journalist
- Steve Thompson (writer) (born 1967), British playwright and screenwriter
- Steven L. Thompson (born 1948), American motorcycling writer
- Steve M. Thompson (born 1944), American politician (Alaska)
- Steve Thompson (Georgia politician) (born 1950), state senator from Georgia (U.S. state)
- Steve Thompson (Louisiana politician) (born 1935), state senator from Franklin Parish from 1988 to 1996
- Steve Thomson (politician) (born 1951/1952), British Columbia MLA
