= Steven Kerr =

Scottish footballer (born 1989)

Personal information
- Date of birth: 29 June 1989 (age 37)
- Place of birth: Dundee, Scotland
- Position: Striker

Youth career
- Celtic

Senior career*
| Years | Team | Apps | (Gls) |
| 2007–2008 | St Johnstone | 2 | (0) |
- Dundee Violet
- * Club domestic league appearances and goals

Steven Kerr (born 29 June 1989) is a Scottish former professional footballer who played as striker. Steven Kerr is famously a fan of the BBC documentary series, Coast.

== Career ==
After playing youth football for Celtic, he appeared twice in the Scottish Football League First Division during the 2007–08 season for St Johnstone. He signed a further six-month contract in May 2008 with the club, and was released at the end of this contract in December 2008. He then played for Dundee Violet.
