= Stephen Adler =

Steve, Steven or Stephen Adler may refer to:

- Stephen J. Adler (born 1955), American journalist and editor-in-chief of Reuters
- Stephen L. Adler (born 1939), American physicist
- Steve Adler (politician) (born 1956), mayor of Austin, Texas
- Steven Adler (born 1965), American rock musician, former Guns N' Roses drummer
