= Stephen Lynch =

Stephen Lynch may refer to:

- Stephen Lynch (musician) (born 1971), American musician and comedian
- Stephen Lynch fitz Dominick Dubh (fl. 1504–1523), mayor of Galway
- Stephen Lynch (English cricketer) (born 1951)
- Stephen Lynch (New Zealand cricketer) (born 1976)
- Stephen Lynch (Franciscan), member of the Order of Saint Francis
- Stephen Lynch (professor), Australian liver transplant surgeon
- Stephen Andrew Lynch (1882–1969), motion picture industry pioneer
- Stephen Lynch (politician) (born 1955), United States representative from Massachusetts
- Steve Lynch (born 1955), original lead guitarist for the band Autograph
- Steve Lynch (politician), member of the Missouri House of Representatives
