= Stephen Joyce =

Stephen or Steven Joyce may refer to:

- Stephen A. Joyce (born 1931), American law enforcement official
- Stephen James Joyce (1932–2020), French-Irish literary executor
- Stephen Joyce (Gaelic footballer) (born 1957), Irish Gaelic football manager and former player
- Steven Joyce (Maine politician) (born 1969), American politician from Maine
- Stephen P. Joyce (born c. 1961), American businessman
- Steven Joyce (born 1963), New Zealand broadcast technology entrepreneur and legislator

== See also ==
- Joyce (name)
