= Stephen Baldwin (disambiguation) =

Stephen Baldwin (born 1966) is an American actor.

Stephen Baldwin may also refer to:

- Stephen Baldwin (politician) (born 1982), American politician
- Stephen Livingstone Baldwin (1835–1902), American missionary

== See also ==
- Frank Stephen Baldwin (1838–1925), American inventor
