= Steven Pitt =

Steven Pitt may refer to:

- Steven Pitt (footballer) (born 1973), Australian rules football player
- Steven Pitt (psychiatrist) (1959–2018), American forensic psychiatrist

== See also ==
- Steve Pitt (born 1948), English footballer
