= Steven Croft =

Steven Croft may refer to:

- Steven Croft (bishop) (born 1957), Anglican bishop of Oxford
- Steven Croft (cricketer) (born 1984), English cricketer
- Steven Croft (snooker player), played in the 2004 World Snooker Championship
- Steven Croft (soccer player), listed in the All-time Albany BWP Highlanders roster
- Stephen Croft, character in Aces High (film)

== See also ==
- Steve Kroft (born 1945), American journalist
- Steven's Croft power station
