= Steven Hoefflin =

American plastic surgeon

Steven M. Hoefflin
- Born: February 7, 1946 (age 80); Seattle, Washington
- Education: University of California, Los Angeles (MD)
- Occupation: Plastic surgeon
- Years active: 1977–present
- Employer: UCLA Medical Center

Steven M. Hoefflin is an American plastic surgeon, known for providing plastic surgery to celebrities, including Elizabeth Taylor, Joan Rivers, Ivana Trump, Phyllis Diller and Michael Jackson. Hoefflin has written several books and published numerous articles in books and medical journals. He has been in private practice since 1977.

== Career ==
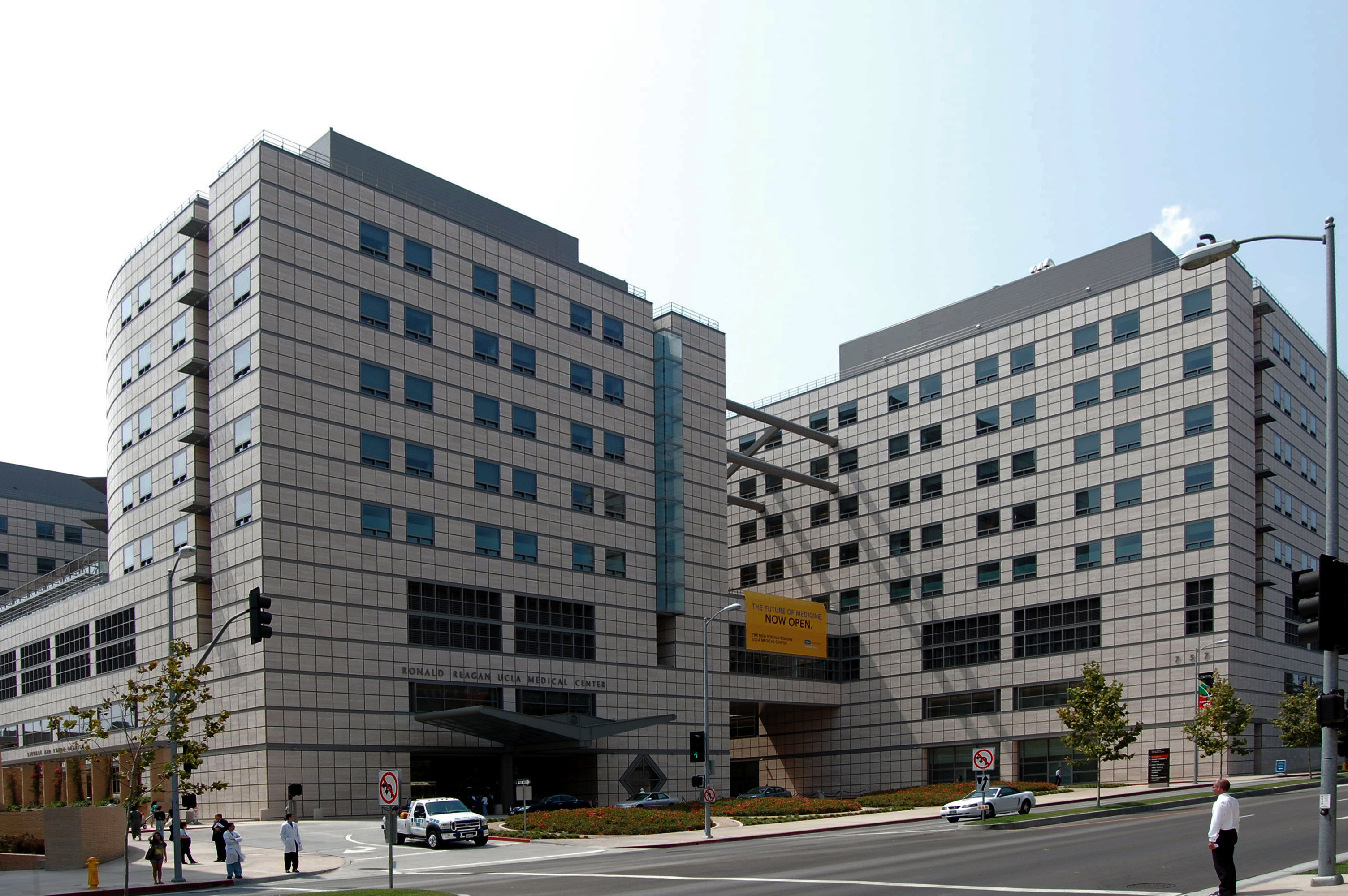
UCLA Medical Center

In 1972, Hoefflin graduated first in his class from the UCLA Medical School where he was a member of the Alpha Omega Alpha honor society. He was the recipient of the UCLA Student Scholastic Achievement Award.

He continued his education in general surgery and completed a plastic surgery residency training program at the UCLA Medical Center. He was the recipient of the coveted Surgical Medal Award. Hoefflin is board-certified by the American Board of Plastic Surgery. Hoefflin became assistant clinical professor of plastic surgery at UCLA Medical Center in 1979. In 1989, he was promoted to associate clinical professor.

Hoefflin was a member of numerous professional organizations where he regularly taught and lectured, including the American Society for Plastic Surgeons and the American Society for Aesthetic Plastic Surgery. He was also a Fellow of the International College of Surgeons, the American College of Surgeons, and the Plastic Surgery Educational Foundation. Moreover, he was president of the Los Angeles Society of Plastic Surgeons and of the UCLA Plastic Surgery Society, the latter for 7 years. Hoefflin was awarded the UCLA Plastic Surgery Clinical Attending Teacher Award twice — in 1985 and 1986.

Hoefflin was chief of plastic surgery at Santa Monica-UCLA Hospital Medical Center (1982–1989) and at Brotman Medical Center (1980-1985), and was on the Medical School Admission Committee at the UCLA School of Medicine (1980-1989).

=== Celebrity plastic surgeon ===
Hoefflin has carried out cosmetic surgery on numerous celebrities, performing a skin graft to Michael Jackson's scalp after the singer was burnt during the filming of a Pepsi commercial in 1984. In 1978, Jackson had his first rhinoplasty by Hoefflin. However, his longest celebrity client was Joan Rivers.

Hoefflin performed a breast reduction, tummy tuck, two nose jobs, cheek implants, a browlift, eyelift, two facelifts, and a chemical peel for Phyllis Diller over several years.

=== False allegations of professional misconduct ===
During a salary dispute in 1997, Hoefflin was accused by four former colleagues (Kim Moore-Mestas, Lidia Benjamin, Barbara Maywood and Donna Burton) of unprofessional conduct towards celebrity clients. The Medical Board of California found no evidence of wrong-doing by Hoefflin. The four former staffers of Hoefflin signed a letter stating that the suit was a working draft that was "inadvertently filled" and that its allegations "were without sufficient factual or legal basis." The letter also expressed regret for "any inconvenience or embarrassment the filing of the complaint has caused." According to Hoefflin, in August 2001, the four former employees who originally made the allegations issued apology letters to Hoefflin and paid a cash settlement.

=== Client list ===
- Elizabeth Taylor
- Joan Rivers
- Ivana Trump
- Michael Jackson
- Janet Jackson
- Sylvester Stallone
- Pamela Anderson
- Tony Curtis
- Phyllis Diller
- Angie Everhart
- Zsa Zsa Gabor
- David Gest
- La Toya Jackson

== Personal life ==
Hoefflin married his first wife, Linda Manus, while still in college. They had two sons, Jeff and Brad, before divorcing in 1976. Hoefflin stated that as a doctor building a practice, "I just did not have time to nurture a relationship." Brad, who suffers from a degenerative neurological disease, lives with Hoefflin and his second wife, Pamela Wilson, at their home in Bel Air. Hoefflin is a descendant of United States President Benjamin Harrison, as well as Luis Terrazas who was the governor of Chihuahua, Mexico. Hoefflin started a Child Poverty Project in Guadalajara, Mexico. It expanded from Mexico City's trash dumps to the shanty town slums on the outskirts of Acapulco. Hoefflin has given prenatal and medical care and has taught other communities emergency care.

Hoefflin is a charcoal and pencil artist. He has trained for two years under the late Glen Orbik and Tim Gula at the California Arts Institute and under Jeffrey Watts at the Watts Atelier in Encinitas, California.

== Bibliography ==
- Taraborrelli, J. Randy (2004). The Magic and the Madness. Terra Alta, WV: Headline. ISBN 0-330-42005-4.
