= Steve Holland =

Steve Holland may refer to:

- Steve Holland (actor) (1925–1997), American actor and model
- Steve Holland (politician) (born 1955), member of the Mississippi House of Representatives
- Steve Holland (footballer) (born 1970), English football coach
- Steve Holland (writer) (born 1968), American television writer and producer
- Savage Steve Holland (born 1960), American writer, film and television director
- Stephen Holland (swimmer) (born 1958), Australian swimmer
- Stephen Holland (artist) (born 1941), American artist
- Steve Holland (musician) (1954–2020), guitarist for Molly Hatchet
- Stephen L. Holland, British comics figure
- Steven M. Holland (paleontologist) (born 1962), American paleontologist and geologist
- Steven M. Holland (physician), American physician-scientist
