= Steven Erie =

American political scientist

Steven P. Erie
- Born: January 28, 1946 (age 80); Glendale, California, U.S.
- Occupations: Political scientist, urban studies scholar
- Years active: 1972–2016
- Employer: University of California, San Diego
- Known for: Infrastructure politics, urban governance, water policy
- Notable work: Rainbow's End, Globalizing L.A., Beyond Chinatown, Paradise Plundered
- Title: Professor Emeritus
- Awards: Norton Long Career Achievement Award, APSA (2016); Robert Park Award, ASA (1989)

Steven P. Erie (born January 28, 1946) is an American political scientist and urban studies scholar known for his work on infrastructure politics, water policy, urban and regional governance and development, and ethnic and racial incorporation in American cities. He is Professor Emeritus of Political Science and former Director of the Urban Studies and Planning Program at the University of California, San Diego (UC San Diego).

== Education and early career ==
Erie was born in Glendale, California. He earned his Bachelor of Arts (1967), Master of Arts (1969), and PhD (1975) in Political Science from the University of California, Los Angeles (UCLA). His doctoral dissertation, The Development of Class and Ethnic Politics in San Francisco, 1870–1910: A Critique of the Pluralist Interpretation, examined how ethnic and class conflicts shaped the rise and fall of local labor parties.

From 1972 to 1981, he held academic positions at the University of Southern California and the State University of New York at Albany. From 1980 to 1981, he also served as a program analyst in the United States Department of Health and Human Services, researching welfare policy.

== Academic career ==
Erie joined the Department of Political Science at UC San Diego in 1981, where he served as Assistant, Associate, and then full Professor until his retirement in 2016. He concurrently held an adjunct appointment in the Department of History (1991–2016) and was Director of the Urban Studies and Planning Program from 2000 to 2014.

== Research and publications ==
Erie's research focuses on the political economy of cities and metropolitan regions, examining the impact of infrastructure and governance on economic development. His work emphasizes how the politics of water supply and trade infrastructure (such as ports and airports) shaped the growth of cities like Los Angeles and San Diego.

== Policy and civic engagement ==
In addition to his academic work, Erie has been involved in public policy debates on infrastructure, governance reform, public finance, and urban planning. He has co-authored policy monographs on airport development, trade infrastructure, urban governance, and water management for the RAND Corporation, the Southern California Association of Governments, and the Los Angeles County Economic Development Corporation.

He served on the Governor's Commission on Building for the 21st century and played an active role in California's water and airport policy debates. Erie also participated in civic efforts for governance reform in San Diego, including the adoption of a strong-mayor system. He has advised public officials, business groups, and civic organizations and authored numerous opinion pieces in the Los Angeles Times, The San Diego Union-Tribune, and other newspapers.

== Honors and awards ==
- Norton Long Career Achievement Award, Urban Politics Section, American Political Science Association (2016)
- Best Book in Urban Politics, APSA (1989, 2012)
- Robert Park Award, Community and Urban Sociology Section, American Sociological Association (1989)
- International Author Award, Lambda Alpha International (2009)
- Donald H. Pflueger Local History Award, Historical Society of Southern California (2006)
- Chancellor's Associates Faculty Award for Excellence in Community Service, UC San Diego (2005)
- Faculty Fellow, National Association of Schools of Public Affairs and Administration (1980–81)
- Teaching awards from UCSD's Earl Warren College and USC's School of Public Administration

== Books ==
- Rainbow's End: Irish-Americans and the Dilemmas of Urban Machine Politics, 1840–1985 (University of California Press, 1988)
- Globalizing L.A.: Trade, Infrastructure, and Regional Development (Stanford University Press, 2004)
- Beyond Chinatown: The Metropolitan Water District, Growth, and the Environment in Southern California (Stanford University Press, 2006)
- Paradise Plundered: Fiscal Crisis and Governance Failures in San Diego (with Vladimir Kogan and Scott A. MacKenzie, Stanford University Press, 2011)

== Selected journal articles ==
- Erie, Steven P. (1992). "How the Urban West Was Won: The Local State and Economic Growth in Los Angeles, 1880–1932". Urban Affairs Quarterly, 27(4): 519–554.
- Erie, Steven P., et al. (2002). "Fiscal Constraints and the Loss of Home Rule: The Long-Term Impacts of California’s Post-Proposition 13 Fiscal Regime". American Review of Public Administration, 32(4): 423–454.
- Erie, Steven P., et al. (2010). "Redevelopment, San Diego Style: The Limits of Public–Private Partnerships". Urban Affairs Review, 45(5): 644–678.
