= Stephen Sullivan =

Stephen or Steve Sullivan may refer to:

- Stephen Sullivan (born 1996), American football tight end
- Steve Sullivan, director of Being Frank: Being Frank the Chris Sievey Story (2018)
- Stephen D. Sullivan (born 1959), American author
- Steve Sullivan (born 1974), Canadian ice hockey player
- Steve Sullivan (1944–2014), American basketball player
- Steve Sullivan (1897–1979), American boxer
