= Stephen Barrett (disambiguation) =

Stephen Barrett (born 1933) is an American psychiatrist and author.

Stephen Barrett may also refer to:

- Stephen Barrett (classics teacher) (1718–1801), British classics teacher who wrote some published translations of Latin texts
- Stephen Barrett (Irish politician) (1913–1976), Irish Fine Gael politician, barrister and judge
- Stephen Barrett (diplomat) (born 1931), British ambassador
- Stephen Barrett (cyclist) (born 1985), Irish track cyclist

== See also ==
- Steve Barratt, Coronation Street character
