= Stephen Flynn (disambiguation) =

Stephen Flynn (born 1988) is a Scottish politician.

Stephen Flynn may also refer to:

- Stephen Flynn (Irish politician) (died 1960), Irish Fianna Fáil politician
- David and Stephen Flynn (born 12 December 1979), also known as The Happy Pear Twins, Irish business people and media personalities

== See also ==
- Stephen O'Flynn, Irish football player
