= Steven Fletcher =

Steven Fletcher may refer to:

- Steven Fletcher (ice hockey) (born 1962), Canadian ice hockey player
- Steven Fletcher (politician) (born 1972), Brazilian-born Canadian politician
- Steve Fletcher (born 1972), English footballer
- Steven Fletcher (footballer) (born 1987), Scottish footballer
