= Steven Zhang =

Steven Zhang may refer to:

- Zhang Kangyang (Chinese: 张康阳, born 1991), Chinese businessman and former chairman of Italian football club Inter Milan
- Zhang Xincheng (Chinese: 张新成, born 1995), Chinese actor
