= Steve Wallace =

Steve Wallace may refer to:

- Steve Wallace (racing driver) (born 1987), stock car driver
- Steve Wallace (American football) (born 1964), former NFL football player
- Stephen Wallace (born 1943), Australian film director
- Stephen Wallace (public servant), Canadian civil servant

== See also ==
- Stephen Wallis (born 1964), Australian rules footballer
