= Stephen Zeh =

American basket weaver

Stephen Zeh is a basket weaver in rural Temple, Maine in the U.S. He uses brown ash that he harvests from the woods near his home, strips it into splints, and enlaces them into baskets. He is mostly self-taught and has been weaving for more than 30 years.

Zeh is represented in the collection of the Smithsonian American Art Museum with Swing Handle Apple Basket, a 2001 work in black ash and brass.
