= Stephen Schwartz (disambiguation) =

Stephen Schwartz (born 1948) is an American musical theater and film lyricist and composer.

Steve, Steven or Stephen Schwartz may also refer to:

- Stephen E. Schwartz (born 1941), American atmospheric scientist
- Stephen Schwartz (pathologist) (1942–2020), American pathologist
- Steven Schwartz (psychologist) (born 1946), American/Australian psychologist
- Stephen Suleyman Schwartz (born 1948), American journalist, political author, and historian
- Steven Jay Schwartz (born 1951), American/British space physicist
- Stephen Schwartz (diplomat) (born 1958), American diplomat
- Stephen S. Schwartz (born 1983), judge of the United States Court of Federal Claims

== See also ==
- Stefan Schwartz (born 1963), English actor
- Stephen (musician) (Stephen Michael Swartz, born 1991), American musician
