= Stephen Douglas (disambiguation) =

Stephen A. Douglas (1813–1861) was an American politician.

Stephen or Steven Douglas may also refer to:

- Stephen Douglas (journalist), British journalist
- Stephen Douglass (1921–2011), American actor

== See also ==
- Steve Douglas (disambiguation)
