= Steve Forde (footballer) =

English footballer

- Forde at West Ham United

Personal information
- Full name: Stephen Forde
- Date of birth: 29 August 1914
- Place of birth: South Kirkby, Yorkshire, England
- Date of death: c. July 1992 (aged 77–78)
- Place of death: South Kirkby, Yorkshire, England (Note: Registered in Q3 1992 in the now-defunct registration district of Claro.)
- Position: Defender

Youth career
- South Kirkby Common Road

Senior career*
Years	Team	Apps	(Gls)
–1933	South Kirkby		
1933	Sheffield Wednesday	0	(0)
1933–1937	Rotherham United	116	(1)
1937–1952	West Ham United	170	(1)

Managerial career
- Penzance
- * Club domestic league appearances and goals

Stephen Forde (Note: Many contemporary sources prior to Forde joining West Ham United give his surname as Ford. This spelling was used in West Ham's initial announcement of his signing, and thereafter corrected.) (29 August 1914 – 1992) was an English footballer who played as a full-back in the Football League for Rotherham United and West Ham United.

== Playing career ==
Forde began his career as a junior at right-back, captaining his school team, and playing with South Kirkby Common Road, before joining South Kirkby. In January 1933 he joined Sheffield Wednesday, who played Ford as a centre-half. After just two months at Wednesday he moved to Rotherham United, where he only missed two first team matches in four seasons.

In January 1937, West Ham United paid a record fee of around £3,000, to beat many other clubs to the signing of Forde from Rotherham. He was initially recruited for the reserve team as a replacement for Bill Adams. He became a regular for the Irons' second string as a full-back, where he formed a partnership with Alf Chalkley. He made his first-team debut on 2 April 1938, a 1–3 loss against Tottenham Hotspur.

== Wartime football ==
During World War II Forde worked in a colliery whilst making guest appearances primarily for West Ham, where he played in the 1940 Football League War Cup semi-final win against Fulham. In 1943 he made guest appearances for Hartlepool United, and also featured for Sunderland and Swindon Town.

After the war, he returned to competitive football with West Ham – his return 7 years, 9 months and 19 days after his previous game remains as the second-longest period between first-team appearances, behind Reg Attwell. He became a regular feature for West Ham and was an ever-present during the 1947–48 season. He retired in 1951 having made 170 Second Division appearances for the club.

== Coaching career ==
After ending his League career in 1951, he spent time as manager of Western League team Penzance.

== Family ==
His younger brother, John, was also a footballer who played for Stoke City and Gainsborough Trinity.
