= Stephen Viscusi =

- Born: June 30; Armonk, New York
- Occupations: C.E.O., executive recruiter, author, radio host, television personality
- Notable work: On the Job: How to Make it in the Real World of Work, Bulletproof Your Job: 4 Simple Strategies to Ride Out the Rough Times and Come Out on Top at Work

Stephen Viscusi is an American author, columnist and broadcast journalist in the workplace genre. He is the CEO of The Viscusi Group, a retainer-based search practice dedicated to the global recruitment of personnel in the interior furnishings industry. He is known for his two books: On the Job: How to Make it in the Real World of Work (2001, Three Rivers Press, a Division of Random House) and Bulletproof Your Job: 4 Simple Strategies to Ride Out the Rough Times and Come Out on Top at Work (2008, HarperCollins. Viscusi is a frequent keynote speaker and adviser to Boards on workplace issues. He has been featured on various networks in a number of shows- NPR, CNN, CBS, CNBC, ABC News, Fox News, American Morning, Good Morning America, nationally syndicated The Tyra Banks Show, and nationally syndicated Steve Harvey. He has contributed to The New York Post and regularly writes for The Huffington Post, Divine Caroline, and The Ladders.

== Career ==
After graduating from Manhattan College with a degree in business, Viscusi worked for five years as a sales manager for Euster Associates Inc. (a Herman Miller and Knoll furniture dealership) in Armonk, New York. He was then recruited to Haworth as a regional manager for the New York City area. He then started his own boutique business, the Viscusi Group, a retainer-based search practice dedicated to the recruitment of personnel in the interior furnishings industry. His business eventually became one of New York City's largest executive search firms, according to Crain's New York Business.

In 2001, Viscusi wrote his first book, On the Job: How to Make it in the Real World of Work. The book was published by Three Rivers Press, a Division of Random House. The book led to his nationally syndicated radio show named after the book, which was a call-in show dealing with workplace issues.

In 2008, Viscusi released his second book, Bulletproof Your Job: 4 Simple Strategies to Ride Out the Rough Times and Come Out on Top at Work, which was published by HarperCollins. The book has been translated into seven languages and was positively reviewed by The Washington Post, Publishers Weekly, Newsweek, Reader's Digest, and Time Magazine.

Charles Gibson of ABC's World News with Charles Gibson called Viscusi “America’s Workplace Guru” which has become his moniker.

== Books ==
- On the Job
- Bulletproof Your Job: 4 Simple Strategies to Ride Out the Rough Times and Come Out on Top at Work
