= Steven Gluzband =

American jazz musician (born 1952)

Steven Alan Gluzband (born July 27, 1952, Boston) is an American Latin jazz trumpeter based in New York City.

== Biography ==
Steve Gluzband was born in Roxbury, Massachusetts to Frank and Rita Gluzband. His father's family had emigrated from Havana, Cuba whereas his mother's family had been in Boston since the 1880s.

At age twelve, Gluzband began playing the accordion and was soon earning money as a solo act, but switched to trumpet at age 14 due to his growing interest in jazz.

Gluzband graduated from the prestigious Boston Latin School and received a bachelor's degree from Boston's Berklee School of Music, where he studied with swing trumpet legend Lennie Johnson (Duke Ellington, Count Basie, Quincy Jones). While attending Berklee, Gluzband performed and toured the east coast with various show bands, but upon seeing a performance of Celia Cruz and Johnny Pacheco in 1975, Gluzband realized it was only a matter of time before he would move to New York City with the intention of playing and recording with the various bands signed with Fania Records.

Gluzband also studied private composition with George Russell and jazz improvisation with Jaki Byard.

== Career ==
=== Recordings and concerts ===
Shortly after arriving in New York in 1979, Gluzband joined the popular salsa band “Saoco”. During the next few years he played numerous gigs with Latin superstars Tito Puente, Mongo Santamaría, Héctor Lavoe, Machito, Celia Cruz, Sonora Matancera, Orlando Contreras, Vicentico Valdez, Ray de la Paz, Larry Harlow, the Alegre All Stars and recorded 18 albums with the famous Haitian recording group Mini All-Stars.

During this period, Gluzband studied privately with Dr. Donald S. Reihnardt in Philadelphia.

Steven became a member of the Ray Barretto Orchestra, where he remained for 20 years, recording three albums with Ray for Fania. While a member of Barretto's group, Gluzband toured Europe, North, South and Latin America dozens of times, appearing at the North Sea Festival and the Montreux Jazz Festival, as well as major jazz venues throughout Europe and the Americas.

During his tenure with Barretto, Gluzband appeared on over 400 recordings, including the Grammy-winning Ritmo en el Corazon (Barretto-Celia Cruz, 1988) and Naked (Talking Heads, 1988), which went double platinum.

In the mid 1990s, Gluzband was an integral part of the short-lived swing revival, touring with Jet Set Six, and playing with Dem Brooklyn Bums, the Blues Jumpers and Dave's True Story.

At the close of the century, Gluzband became a member of the Jimmy Bosch band. The band performed "Salsa Vivaldi" with the Chicago Symphony Orchestra, the Los Angeles Philharmonic and the Denver Symphony in which Gluzband was a featured trumpet soloist.

During this period Gluzband appeared with Marc Anthony and Paul Simon several times at Madison Square Garden.

=== Film and television ===
In the first decade of the 21st century, Gluzband was heard on MTV's Road Rules and was staff trumpeter for Nickelodeon's Blue's Clues. In addition Steven's trumpet solos were featured in the films Mad Hot Ballroom (2005) and Happy Accidents (2000).

=== Present ===
Gluzband was a member of Johnny Pacheco's band from 2006 until his passing, and currently leads his own Latin jazz ensemble Hot House, whose debut 2008 release, Cuban Tribute to Charlie Parker, was nominated in five categories for the Grammy Awards.

Gluzband's latest recording, Hot House @ Street Level, received a Global Music Award.
