= Stephen Brown =

Stephen Brown or Steven Brown may refer to:

== Arts and entertainment ==
- Stephen Brown (composer) (born 1948), Canadian composer
- Stephen Brown (film producer) (born 1961), American film producer, media executive and entrepreneur
- Stephen Brown (Jesuit) (1881–1962), Irish writer, bibliographer, librarian
- Stephen Brown (playwright), English playwright
- Stephen Mark Brown, American opera singer
- Steven Brown (born 1952), member of the American band Tuxedomoon

== Military ==
- Stephen F. Brown (1841–1903), Union Army officer in the American Civil War

== Politics and diplomacy ==
- Stephen Brown (diplomat) (born 1945), British diplomat
- Stephen Brown (judge) (1924–2025), member of the British privy council
- Stephen Campbell Brown (1829–1882), Australian politician
- Steven Brown (politician), American politician

== Science and technology ==
- Stephen Clif Brown (born 1948), American engineer and pundit
- Stephen D. M. Brown (born 1955), British geneticist
- Stephen G. R. Brown, British materials scientist

== Sports ==
- Stephen Brown (athlete) (born 1969), Trinidadian hurdler
- Stephen Brown (canoeist) (born 1956), British sprint canoer
- Steven Brown (golfer) (born 1987), English golfer
- Steven Brown (judoka) (born 1986), Australian judoka who competed in the 2008 Olympics
- Steven Brown (cricketer) (born 1979), Zimbabwean cricketer
- Stevens Brown (1875–1957), English cricketer, referred to as Stephen Brown before 1911

== Similar names ==
- Stephen Brown-Fried, American stage director
- Stephen Brown House (disambiguation)
- Steve Brown (disambiguation)
- Steven Browne (born 1989), Australian rules footballer
