= 49th Primetime Emmy Awards =

1997 American television programming awards

- Date: September 14, 1997 (Ceremony); September 7, 1997 (Creative Arts Awards)
- Location: Pasadena Civic Auditorium, Pasadena, California
- Presented by: Academy of Television Arts and Sciences
- Hosted by: Bryant Gumbel

Highlights
- Most awards: Major: NYPD Blue (4); All: 3rd Rock From the Sun (6)
- Most nominations: ER (14)
- Outstanding Comedy Series: Frasier
- Outstanding Drama Series: Law & Order
- Outstanding Miniseries: Prime Suspect V: Errors of Judgement
- Outstanding Variety Series: Tracey Takes On...

Television/radio coverage
- Network: CBS
- Produced by: Darnette Herman; Michael Seligman

The 49th Primetime Emmy Awards were held at the Pasadena Civic Auditorium in Pasadena, California, in 1997. They were presented in two ceremonies hosted by Bryant Gumbel, one on Saturday, September 13 and another on Sunday, September 14. The September 14th ceremony was televised on CBS and presented 27 awards.

Frasier became the first series to win Outstanding Comedy Series four consecutive years, it joined Hill Street Blues which won Outstanding Drama Series four straight years a decade earlier. For the first time since 1979, James Burrows did not receive a Directing nomination, ending his run at 17 consecutive years. Beginning the following year, Burrows would begin a new streak that lasted another six years. In the drama field perennial nominee Law & Order won for its seventh season, the first time a show had won for this specific season. In winning Law & Order became the first drama series that did not have serialized story arcs (Note: Saying Law & Order had no serialized arcs is potentially misleading. It's true that Law & Order is at its core a procedural, with only very lightly-serialized elements as a general rule. However, in its Emmy-winning season, the show had a three-episode arc—"D-Girl", "Turnaround", and "Showtime"—concerning a high-profile murder case. In addition, the episode "Entrapment" was a sequel to season 3's "Conspiracy" .) since Hill Street Blues perfected the formula. Law & Order remains the only non-serialized winner since 1981.

For the first time, not only did the Fox Network win the Lead Actress, Drama award, with Gillian Anderson, for The X-Files, but hers was also the network's first win in any of the Major Acting categories. (Laurence Fishburne and Peter Boyle won for Fox in only guest performances. The latter of which was for The X-Files just the year before.)

This ceremony marked the end of a 20-year residency for the Primetime Emmy Awards at the Pasadena Civic Auditorium dating back to the 29th Primetime Emmy Awards in 1977 ceremony.

This is the most recent year in which the Big Four Networks (ABC, CBS, FOX, and NBC) took home the top 14 Emmys (Comedy and Drama Series, Actor, Actress, Supporting Actor, Supporting Actress in Comedy and Drama, and Directing and Writing for Comedy and Drama).

The Larry Sanders Show had 16 nominations and zero wins, tying the record with Northern Exposure in 1993 and becoming the first (and only to date) comedy series to set the record. These records would later be broken by Mad Men in 2012 with 17 nominations and without a single win and The Handmaid's Tale in 2021 with 21 nominations and without a single win.

== Winners and nominees ==
=== Programs ===
Outstanding Comedy Series: Frasier (NBC); 3rd Rock from the Sun (NBC); The Larry Sanders Show (HBO); Mad About You (NBC); Seinfeld (NBC)	Outstanding Drama Series: Law & Order (NBC); Chicago Hope (CBS); ER (NBC); NYPD Blue (ABC); The X-Files (Fox)
Outstanding Variety, Music or Comedy Series: Tracey Takes On... (HBO); Dennis Miller Live (HBO); Late Show with David Letterman (CBS); Politically Incorrect with Bill Maher (ABC); The Tonight Show with Jay Leno (NBC)	Outstanding Variety, Music or Comedy Special: Chris Rock: Bring the Pain (HBO); The 50th Annual Tony Awards (CBS); The 69th Annual Academy Awards (ABC); Bette Midler: Diva Las Vegas (HBO); George Carlin: 40 Years of Comedy (HBO)
Outstanding Made for Television Movie: Miss Evers' Boys (HBO); Bastard Out of Carolina (Showtime); Gotti (HBO); If These Walls Could Talk (HBO); In the Gloaming (HBO)	Outstanding Miniseries: Prime Suspect V: Errors of Judgement (PBS); In Cold Blood (CBS); The Last Don (CBS); The Odyssey (NBC); The Shining (ABC)

=== Acting ===
==== Lead performances ====
Outstanding Lead Actor in a Comedy Series: John Lithgow as Dr. Dick Solomon in 3rd Rock from the Sun (NBC) (Episode: "See Dick Continue to Run"); Michael J. Fox as Mike Flaherty in Spin City (ABC) (Episode: "Prototype"); Kelsey Grammer as Dr. Frasier Crane in Frasier (NBC) (Episode: "Ham Radio"); Paul Reiser as Paul Buchman in Mad About You (NBC) (Episode: "The Birth"); Garry Shandling as Larry Sanders in The Larry Sanders Show (HBO) (Episode: "Everybody Loves Larry")	Outstanding Lead Actress in a Comedy Series: Helen Hunt as Jamie Buchman in Mad About You (NBC) (Episode: "The Birth"); Ellen DeGeneres as Ellen Morgan in Ellen (ABC) (Episode: "The Puppy Episode"); Fran Drescher as Fran Fine in The Nanny (CBS) (Episode: "The Facts of Lice"); Patricia Richardson as Jill Taylor in Home Improvement (ABC) (Episode: "Family Unties"); Cybill Shepherd as Cybill Sheridan in Cybill (CBS) (Episode: "In Her Dreams")
Outstanding Lead Actor in a Drama Series: Dennis Franz as Andy Sipowicz in NYPD Blue (ABC) (Episode: "Where's 'Swaldo?"); David Duchovny as FBI Special Agent Fox Mulder in The X-Files (Fox) (Episode: "Small Potatoes"); Anthony Edwards as Dr. Mark Greene in ER (NBC) (Episode: "Tribes"); Jimmy Smits as Bobby Simone in NYPD Blue (ABC) (Episode: "My Wild Irish Nose"); Sam Waterston as Jack McCoy in Law & Order (NBC) (Episode: "Mad Dog")	Outstanding Lead Actress in a Drama Series: Gillian Anderson as Dr. Dana Scully in The X-Files (Fox) (Episode: "Memento Mori"); Roma Downey as Monica in Touched by an Angel (CBS) (Episode: "Missing in Action"); Christine Lahti as Dr. Kate Austin in Chicago Hope (CBS) (Episode: "Back to the Future"); Julianna Margulies as Carol Hathaway in ER (NBC) (Episode: "The Long Way Around"); Sherry Stringfield as Dr. Susan Lewis in ER (NBC) (Episode: "Fear of Flying")
Outstanding Lead Actor in a Miniseries or a Special: Armand Assante as John Gotti in Gotti (HBO); Beau Bridges as Bill Januson in Hidden in America (Showtime); Robert Duvall as Adolf Eichmann in The Man Who Captured Eichmann (TNT); Laurence Fishburne as Caleb Humphries in Miss Evers' Boys (HBO); Sidney Poitier as Nelson Mandela in Mandela and de Klerk (Showtime)	Outstanding Lead Actress in a Miniseries or a Special: Alfre Woodard as Nurse Eunice Evers in Miss Evers' Boys (HBO); Stockard Channing as Barbara Whitney in An Unexpected Family (USA); Glenn Close as Janet in In the Gloaming (HBO); Helen Mirren as DCI Jane Tennison in Prime Suspect V: Errors of Judgement (PBS); Meryl Streep as Lori Reimuller in ...First Do No Harm (ABC)
Outstanding Performance in a Variety or Music Program: Bette Midler in Bette Midler: Diva Las Vegas (HBO); George Carlin in George Carlin: 40 Years of Comedy (HBO); Billy Crystal in The 69th Annual Academy Awards (ABC); Bill Maher in Politically Incorrect with Bill Maher (ABC); Tracey Ullman in Tracey Takes On... (HBO)

==== Supporting performances ====
Outstanding Supporting Actor in a Comedy Series: Michael Richards as Cosmo Kramer in Seinfeld (NBC) (Episode: "The Chicken Roaster"); Jason Alexander as George Costanza in Seinfeld (NBC) (Episode: "The Comeback"); David Hyde Pierce as Dr. Niles Crane in Frasier (NBC) (Episodes: "Mixed Doubles" + "Daphne Hates Sherry"); Jeffrey Tambor as Hank Kingsley in The Larry Sanders Show (HBO); Rip Torn as Arthur in The Larry Sanders Show (HBO)	Outstanding Supporting Actress in a Comedy Series: Kristen Johnston as Sally Solomon in 3rd Rock from the Sun (NBC) (Episodes: "My Mother the Alien" + "Fifteen Minutes of Dick"); Christine Baranski as Maryann Thorpe in Cybill (CBS); Janeane Garofalo as Paula in The Larry Sanders Show (HBO); Lisa Kudrow as Phoebe Buffay in Friends (NBC) (Episodes: "The One with the Metaphorical Tunnel" + "The One with the Flashback"); Julia Louis-Dreyfus as Elaine Benes in Seinfeld (NBC) (Episode: "The Little Kicks")
Outstanding Supporting Actor in a Drama Series: Héctor Elizondo as Dr. Phillip Watters in Chicago Hope (CBS) (Episodes: "A Time to Kill" + "The Son Also Rises"); Adam Arkin as Dr. Aaron Shutt in Chicago Hope (CBS) (Episodes: "Missed Conception" + "The Son Also Rises"); Eriq La Salle as Dr. Peter Benton in ER (NBC); Nicholas Turturro as James Martinez in NYPD Blue (ABC) (Episodes: "Yes, We Have No Cannolis" + "Where'd the Van Gogh?"); Noah Wyle as Dr. John Carter in ER (NBC)	Outstanding Supporting Actress in a Drama Series: Kim Delaney as Diane Russell in NYPD Blue (ABC) (Episodes: "Caulksmanship" + "Upstairs, Downstairs"); Laura Innes as Dr. Kerry Weaver in ER (NBC); C. C. H. Pounder as Dr. Angela Hicks in ER (NBC); Della Reese as Tess in Touched by an Angel (CBS); Gloria Reuben as Jeanie Boulet in ER (NBC)
Outstanding Supporting Actor in a Miniseries or a Special: Beau Bridges as Governor Jim Farley in The Second Civil War (HBO); Obba Babatundé as Willie Johnson in Miss Evers' Boys (HBO); Michael Caine as F. W. de Klerk in Mandela and de Klerk (Showtime); Ossie Davis as Mr. Evers in Miss Evers' Boys (HBO); Joe Mantegna as Pippi De Lena in The Last Don (CBS)	Outstanding Supporting Actress in a Miniseries or a Special: Diana Rigg as Mrs. Danvers in Rebecca (PBS); Kirstie Alley as Rose Marie in The Last Don (CBS); Bridget Fonda as Anne in In the Gloaming (HBO); Glenne Headly as Ruth in Bastard Out of Carolina (Showtime); Frances McDormand as Gus in Hidden in America (Showtime)

=== Directing ===
Outstanding Directing for a Comedy Series: Frasier (NBC): "To Kill a Talking Bird" – David Lee; Ellen (ABC): "The Puppy Episode" – Gil Junger; The Larry Sanders Show (HBO): "Ellen, Or Isn't She?" – Alan Myerson; The Larry Sanders Show (HBO): "Everybody Loves Larry" – Todd Holland; Seinfeld (NBC): "The Pothole" – Andy Ackerman	Outstanding Directing for a Drama Series: NYPD Blue (ABC): "Where's 'Swaldo?" – Mark Tinker; ER (NBC): "Fear of Flying" – Christopher Chulack; ER (NBC): "Last Call" – Rod Holcomb; ER (NBC): "Union Station" – Tom Moore; The X-Files (Fox): "Musings of a Cigarette Smoking Man" – James Wong
Outstanding Directing for a Variety or Music Program: Centennial Olympic Games: Opening Ceremonies (NBC) – Don Mischer; The 69th Annual Academy Awards (ABC) – Louis J. Horvitz; Bette Midler: Diva Las Vegas (HBO) – Marty Callner; The Tonight Show with Jay Leno (NBC) – Ellen Brown; Tracey Takes On... (HBO) – Thomas Schlamme	Outstanding Directing for a Miniseries or a Special: The Odyssey (NBC) – Andrei Konchalovsky; Bastard Out of Carolina (Showtime) – Anjelica Huston; Crime of the Century (HBO) – Mark Rydell; Gotti (HBO) – Robert Harmon; In the Gloaming (HBO) – Christopher Reeve

=== Writing ===
Outstanding Writing for a Comedy Series: Ellen (ABC): "The Puppy Episode" – Story by : Ellen DeGeneres Teleplay by : Mark Driscoll, Dava Savel, Tracy Newman and Jonathan Stark; The Larry Sanders Show (HBO): "Ellen, or Isn't She?" – Story by : Garry Shandling, Judd Apatow and John Markus Teleplay by : Judd Apatow and John Markus; The Larry Sanders Show (HBO): "Everybody Loves Larry" – Jon Vitti; The Larry Sanders Show (HBO): "My Name is Asher Kingsley" – Peter Tolan; Seinfeld (NBC): "The Yada Yada" – Peter Mehlman and Jill Franklyn	Outstanding Writing for a Drama Series: NYPD Blue (ABC): "Where's 'Swaldo?" – Stephen Gaghan, Michael R. Perry and David Milch; ER (NBC): "Faith" – John Wells; ER (NBC): "Whose Appy Now?" – Neal Baer; NYPD Blue (ABC): "Taillight's Last Gleaming" – David Mills; The X-Files (Fox): "Memento Mori" – Chris Carter, Vince Gilligan, John Shiban and Frank Spotnitz
Outstanding Writing for a Variety or Music Program: Chris Rock: Bring the Pain (HBO) – Chris Rock; Dennis Miller Live (HBO); Late Night with Conan O'Brien 3rd Anniversary Show (NBC); Late Show with David Letterman (CBS); Politically Incorrect with Bill Maher (ABC); Tracey Takes On... (HBO): "Vegas"	Outstanding Writing for a Miniseries or a Special: William Faulkner's Old Man (Hallmark Hall of Fame) (CBS) – Horton Foote; Crime of the Century (HBO) – William Nicholson; Gotti (HBO) – Steve Shagan; Miss Evers' Boys (HBO) – Walter Bernstein; Weapons of Mass Distraction (HBO) – Larry Gelbart

== Most major nominations ==
Networks with multiple major nominations (Note: "Major" constitutes the categories listed above: Program, Acting, Directing, and Writing. Does not include the technical categories.)
Network	No. of Nominations
NBC	50
HBO	41
CBS	21
ABC	19

Programs with multiple major nominations
Program	Category	Network	No. of Nominations
ER	Drama	NBC	14
The Larry Sanders Show	Comedy	HBO	10
NYPD Blue	Drama	ABC	8
Miss Evers' Boys	Movie	HBO	6
Seinfeld	Comedy	NBC	6
The X-Files	Drama	Fox	5
Chicago Hope	Drama	CBS	4
Frasier	Comedy	NBC	4
Gotti	Movie	HBO	4
In the Gloaming	Movie	HBO	4
Tracey Takes On...	Variety	HBO	4
3rd Rock from the Sun	Comedy	NBC	3
The 69th Annual Academy Awards	Variety	ABC	3
Bastard Out of Carolina	Movie	Showtime	3
Bette Midler: Diva Las Vegas	Variety	HBO	3
Ellen	Comedy	ABC	3
The Last Don	Miniseries	CBS	3
Mad About You	Comedy	NBC	3
Politically Incorrect with Bill Maher	Variety	ABC	3
Chris Rock: Bring the Pain	Variety	HBO	2
Cybill	Comedy	CBS	2
Dennis Miller Live	Variety	HBO	2
George Carlin: 40 Years of Comedy	Variety	HBO	2
Hidden in America	Movie	Showtime	2
Late Show with David Letterman	Variety	CBS	2
Law & Order	Drama	NBC	2
Mandela and de Klerk	Movie	Showtime	2
The Odyssey	Miniseries	NBC	2
Prime Suspect V: Errors of Judgement	Miniseries	PBS	2
The Tonight Show with Jay Leno	Variety	NBC	2
Touched by an Angel	Drama	CBS	2

== Most major awards ==
Networks with multiple major awards
Network	No. of Awards
NBC	9
HBO	8
ABC	5
CBS	2
PBS	2

Programs with multiple major awards
Program	Category	Network	No. of Awards
NYPD Blue	Drama	ABC	4
3rd Rock from the Sun	Comedy	NBC	2
Chris Rock: Bring the Pain	Variety	HBO	2
Frasier	Comedy	NBC	2
Miss Evers' Boys	Movie	HBO	2
