= Prime Suspect =

British police procedural TV series (1991–2006)

- Prime Suspect title
- Genre: Police procedural
- Created by: Lynda La Plante
- Starring: Helen Mirren
- Composer: Stephen Warbeck
- Country of origin: United Kingdom
- Original language: English
- No. of series: 7
- No. of episodes: 15 (list of episodes)

Production
- Running time: 100 minutes
- Production companies: Granada Television/ITV Productions; WGBH Boston

Original release
- Network: ITV
- Release: 7 April 1991 – 22 October 2006

Prime Suspect is a British police procedural television series devised by Lynda La Plante. Broadcast on ITV between 1991 and 2006, it stars Helen Mirren as Jane Tennison, one of the first female Detective Chief Inspectors in Greater London's Metropolitan Police Service, who rises to the rank of Detective Superintendent while confronting institutionalised sexism within the police force.

Mirren won three consecutive British Academy Television Awards for Best Actress between 1992-94, two Primetime Emmy Award for Outstanding Lead Actress in a Limited or Anthology Series or Movie, and in 2006, the British public ranked her number 29 in ITV's poll of TV's 50 Greatest Stars.

== Plot ==
Prime Suspect focuses on a no-nonsense female Detective Chief Inspector (DCI), Jane Tennison (played by Helen Mirren), who is an officer in the Metropolitan Police, initially at the fictional Southampton Row police station.

The series follows her constant battles to prove herself within a male-dominated profession in which many of her colleagues are determined to see her fail, though she has the support of her boss, Detective Chief Superintendent Mike Kernan (John Benfield), and the loyalty of Detective Inspector Richard Haskons (Richard Hawley).

In later series, Tennison is reassigned to rotating duties, including a vice squad in Soho and a gang squad in Manchester. She is promoted to Detective Superintendent in series 4 and retires from policing at the end of series 7.

== Cast ==
=== Main cast ===
- Helen Mirren as Detective Chief Inspector Jane Tennison, initially of Southampton Row Police Station in Central London, later Detective Superintendent in series 4. Mirren has described Tennison as "extremely directed, ambitious, talented and very uncompromising. Therefore she is deeply frustrated by her job; the way her sex is a barrier."
- John Benfield as Detective Superintendent Michael Kernan (series 1–4), Tennison's supervisor, later Detective Chief Superintendent
- Richard Hawley as Detective Constable Richard Haskons (series 1–4), later Detective Sergeant and Detective Inspector
- Tom Bell as Detective Sergeant Bill Otley (series 1, 3, 7)
- Jack Ellis as Detective Inspector Tony Muddyman (series 1–2, 4)
- Craig Fairbrass as Detective Inspector Frank Burkin (series 1–2)
- Mossie Smith as Constable Maureen Havers (series 1, 4)
- Ian Fitzgibbon as Detective Constable Jones (series 1–2)
- Philip Wright as Detective Constable Lillie (series 1–3)
- Andrew Tiernan as Detective Constable Rosper (series 1–2)
- Gary Whelan as Detective Sergeant Terry Amson (series 1)
- Stephen Boxer as Detective Chief Inspector Thorndike, later Detective Superintendent (series 2–4)
- Stafford Gordon as Commander Traynor (series 2–4)
- Mark Strong as Detective Inspector Larry Hall (series 3, 6), later Detective Chief Superintendent in series 6
- Robert Pugh as Detective Sergeant Alun Simms (series 6–7)

=== Supporting cast, including notable guest stars ===
- John Forgeham as Detective Chief Inspector John Shefford (series 1)
- Tom Wilkinson as Peter Rawlins (series 1), Tennison's divorced live-in boyfriend
- Zoë Wanamaker as Moyra Hanson (series 1), George Marlow's common law wife
- Ralph Fiennes as Michael (series 1)
- John Bowe as George Marlow (series 1)
- Maxine Audley as Doris Marlow (series 1)
- Colin Salmon as Detective Sergeant Bob Oswalde (series 2)
- George Harris as Vernon Allen (series 2)
- Lloyd McGuire as Sergeant Calder (series 2)
- Peter Capaldi as Vera/Vernon Reynolds (series 3)
- Andrew Woodall as Detective Inspector Brian Dalton (series 3)
- David Thewlis as James Jackson (series 3)
- James Frain as Jason Baldwin (series 3), an adult child abuse victim
- Struan Rodger as Superintendent Halliday (series 3)
- Chris Fairbank as Detective Chief Inspector David Lyall (series 3)
- Ciarán Hinds as Edward Parker-Jones (series 3), the manager of a community centre
- Kelly Hunter as Jessica Smithy (series 3), a reporter
- Jonny Lee Miller as Anthony Field (series 3), an adult victim of child abuse
- Mark Drewry as Detective Inspector Ray Hebdon (series 3)
- Danny Dyer as Martin Fletcher (series 3), a homeless street boy
- Jeremy Colton as David Driscoll (series 3)
- Stuart Wilson as Dr Patrick Schofield (series 4), a psychologist whom Tennison consults, and then dates
- Anthony Daniels as a pathologist (series 4)
- Sophie Stanton as Detective Sergeant Christine Cromwell (series 4)
- Beatie Edney as Susan Covington (series 4), a young mother whose child is kidnapped
- Robert Glenister as Chris Hughes (series 4)
- Lesley Sharp as Anne Sutherland (series 4)
- Jill Baker as Maria Henry (series 4), a lawyer
- Kelly Reilly as Polly Henry (series 4), Maria's daughter
- Christopher Fulford as Detective Chief Inspector Tom Mitchell (series 4)
- Tim Woodward as George Marlow (series 4)
- Joyce Redman as Doris Marlow (series 4)
- David Ryall as Oscar Bream (series 2,4)
- Marc Warren as Detective Constable Andy Dyson (series 4)
- Steven Mackintosh as Clive Norton a.k.a. "The Street" (series 5)
- David O'Hara as Detective Sergeant Gerry Rankine (series 5)
- Marsha Thomason as Janice Lafferty (series 5)
- Ray Emmet Brown as Michael Johns (series 5)
- John McArdle as Detective Chief Superintendent Ballinger (series 5)
- Julia Lane as Detective Inspector Claire Devanney (series 5)
- Liam Cunningham as Robert West (series 6)
- Ben Miles as Detective Chief Inspector Simon Finch (series 6)
- Sam Hazeldine as Detective Constable David Butcher (series 6)
- Barnaby Kay as Detective Constable Michael Philips (series 6)
- Ingeborga Dapkūnaitė as Jasmina Blekic (series 6)
- Tanya Moodie as Detective Constable Lorna Grieves (series 6)
- Velibor Topic as Dusan Zigic (series 6)
- Oleg Menshikov as Milan Lukic/Dragan Yankovich (series 6)
- Clare Holman as Mrs Lukic (series 6)
- Frank Finlay as Arnold Tennison (series 6)
- Phoebe Nicholls as Shaw (series 6)
- Rad Lazar as Kasim Ibrahimovic (series 6)
- Gary Lewis as Tony Sturdy (series 7)
- Stephen Tompkinson as Sean Philips (series 7)
- Laura Greenwood as Penny Philips (series 7)
- Eve Best as Linda Philips (series 7)
- Brendan Coyle as DCS Mitchell (series 7)
- Robbie Gee as Detective Inspector Traynor (series 7)
- Ellie Kendrick as Melanie (series 7)
- Russell Mabey as Detective Inspector Cox (series 7)
- Carolyn Pickles as Pauline Hammond (series 7)

== Episodes ==
Series	Episodes	Originally released		Avg. UK viewers (millions)
Series	Episodes	First released	Last released	Avg. UK viewers (millions)
1	2	7 April 1991	8 April 1991	14.02
2	2	15 December 1992	16 December 1992	14.35
3	2	19 December 1993	20 December 1993	14.15
4	3	30 April 1995	15 May 1995	12.73
5	2	20 October 1996	21 October 1996	14.52
6	2	9 November 2003	10 November 2003	10.19
7	2	15 October 2006	22 October 2006	8.21

== Concept and development ==
=== Themes ===
The first series features sexism in the workplace as a significant subplot and a barrier to the investigation. Sequels have tended to downplay this theme, relying on straight procedure or on other subplots, such as institutional racism in Prime Suspect 2 or child sexual abuse and prostitution in Prime Suspect 3, but they continue to demonstrate the determination of some of Tennison's male peers and those in upper echelons to see her fail.

Tennison's difficulty in achieving a balance between her work and her life outside the job, and her difficulty in maintaining stable relationships, are recurring themes within the series. Towards the end of Prime Suspect 3 she arranges to have her pregnancy terminated. As the series progresses, she increasingly relies on alcohol to help her cope. This culminates in the final episode of the series in her attending meetings of Alcoholics Anonymous, where she finally acknowledges and confronts her addiction.

=== Setting ===
Prime Suspect is set mostly in London and surrounding areas, but series 5 is set in Manchester.

=== Production ===
Every series of Prime Suspect except series 4 follows a single case and runs around 3 1/2 hours (excluding commercials). It has usually been shown in two or four parts. Prime Suspect 4 is an exception at slightly over five hours, with three separate cases.

The first five series were produced annually from 1991 to 1996, until Mirren left the role, supposedly to avoid typecasting (according to a PBS interview). She returned to play the character in 2003 and again in 2006.

Prime Suspect was produced by Granada Television for the ITV network. Series 4 to 7 were co-produced by WGBH Boston for its Masterpiece Mystery anthology series.

=== Music ===
The first five series were scored by the Academy Award-winning composer Stephen Warbeck, who was nominated for a BAFTA TV Award for Prime Suspect series one. Rob Lane composed the music for Series 6. Nicholas Hooper won a BAFTA TV Award for his score for Series 7.

== Reception and impact ==
Prime Suspect was voted 68th in the list of 100 Greatest British Television Programmes as compiled by a poll given by the British Film Institute, and in 2007 it was listed as one of Time magazine's "100 Best TV Shows of All-TIME." The series has won multiple BAFTA Awards, Emmy Awards, and a Peabody Award.

=== Awards and nominations ===
Prime Suspect won the BAFTA TV Award for Best Drama Serial over G.B.H. in 1991. Afterwards, four of the seven voting members of the jury raised a discrepancy to jury chairperson Irene Shubik, and later signed a public statement declaring that they had voted for G.B.H. to win. BAFTA Chairman Richard Price stated that the ballot papers passed on to him by Shubik had shown four votes for Prime Suspect and three for G.B.H. Price claimed that the ballot papers could not be recounted as they had subsequently been destroyed. Prime Suspect won Best Drama Serial once more for series 3, and was nominated four other times. The series won the Primetime Emmy Award for Outstanding Miniseries three times, and was nominated twice more.

Mirren won three BAFTA TV Awards for Best Actress for the role, and has been nominated three other times. She won the Primetime Emmy Award for Outstanding Lead Actress in a Limited Series or Movie twice, with four additional nominations.

Prime Suspect 3 was awarded a Peabody Award in 1993 for its realistic scenes and dialogue. Writer/creator Lynda La Plante received an Edgar Award from the Mystery Writers of America for series 1 in the category of Best TV Feature or Miniseries. The following year, Allan Cubitt won in the same category for series 2. Prime Suspect was later nominated for series 3 and 6.

Series	Award	Category	Nominee(s)	Result	Ref.
Series 1 (1991)	British Academy Television Awards	Best Drama Serial	Christopher Menaul, Lynda La Plante, Don Leaver	Won	
Series 1 (1991)	British Academy Television Awards	Best Actress	Helen Mirren	Won	
Series 1 (1991)	British Academy Television Awards	Best Actress	Zoe Wanamaker	Nominated	
Series 1 (1991)	British Academy Television Awards	Best Actor	Tom Bell	Nominated	
Series 1 (1991)	British Academy Television Awards	Best Film or Video Editor – Fiction	Edward Mansell	Won	
Series 1 (1991)	British Academy Television Awards	Best Film or Video Photography – Fiction	Ken Morgan	Won	
Series 1 (1991)	British Academy Television Awards	Best Sound – Fiction	Ray French, Brian Saunders, John Rutherford, Paul Griffiths-Davies	Nominated	
Series 1 (1991)	British Academy Television Awards	Best Design	Roy Stonehouse	Nominated	
Series 1 (1991)	British Academy Television Awards	Best Original Television Music	Stephen Warbeck	Nominated	
Series 1 (1991)	Edgar Awards	Best TV Feature or Miniseries	Lynda La Plante	Won	
Series 1 (1991)	Royal Television Society Awards	Best Single Drama	Prime Suspect	Won	
Series 1 (1991)	Royal Television Society Awards	Performance Award	Helen Mirren	Won	
Series 1 (1991)	Royal Television Society Awards	Writer's Award	Lynda La Plante	Won	
Series 2 (1992)	British Academy Television Awards	Best Drama Serial	Paul Marcus, John Strickland, Allan Cubitt	Nominated	
Series 2 (1992)	British Academy Television Awards	Best Actress	Helen Mirren	Won	
Series 2 (1992)	British Academy Television Awards	Best Film or Video Editor – Fiction	Edward Mansell	Nominated	
Series 2 (1992)	British Academy Television Awards	Best Sound – Fiction	Nick Steer, John Rutherford, John Thomas, John Senior, Jaquie Ophir, John Whitworth	Nominated	
Series 2 (1992)	Primetime Emmy Awards	Outstanding Miniseries	Sally Head, Paul Marcus	Won	
Series 2 (1992)	Primetime Emmy Awards	Outstanding Lead Actress in a Miniseries or Special	Helen Mirren	Nominated	
Series 2 (1992)	Edgar Awards	Best TV Feature or Miniseries	Allan Cubitt	Won	
Series 3 (1993)	British Academy Television Awards	Best Drama Serial	Paul Marcus, David Drury, Lynda La Plante	Won	
Series 3 (1993)	British Academy Television Awards	Best Actress	Helen Mirren	Won	
Series 3 (1993)	British Academy Television Awards	Best Film or Video Editor – Fiction	Edward Mansell	Nominated	
Series 3 (1993)	British Academy Television Awards	Best Design	Chris Truelove	Nominated	
Series 3 (1993)	Primetime Emmy Awards	Outstanding Miniseries	Sally Head, Paul Marcus	Won	
Series 3 (1993)	Primetime Emmy Awards	Outstanding Lead Actress in a Miniseries or Special	Helen Mirren	Nominated	
Series 3 (1993)	Primetime Emmy Awards	Outstanding Writing in a Miniseries or Special	Lynda La Plante	Nominated	
Series 3 (1993)	Peabody Award		Prime Suspect	Won	
Series 3 (1993)	Edgar Awards	Best TV Feature or Miniseries	Lynda La Plante	Nominated	
Series 4 (1995)	British Academy Television Awards	Best Drama Series	Paul Marcus	Nominated	
Series 4 (1995)	British Academy Television Awards	Best Actress	Helen Mirren	Nominated	
Series 4 (1995)	British Academy Television Awards	Photography and Lighting – Fiction	David Odd	Nominated	
Series 4 (1995)	British Academy Television Awards	Best Sound – Fiction/Entertainment	Nick Steer, John Rutherford, John Senior, John Whitworth	Nominated	
Series 4 (1995)	Primetime Emmy Awards	Outstanding Lead Actress in a Miniseries or a Special	Helen Mirren (for "Scent of Darkness")	Won	
Series 5 (1996)	British Academy Television Awards	Best Actress	Helen Mirren	Nominated	
Series 5 (1996)	Primetime Emmy Awards	Outstanding Miniseries	Gub Neal, Rebecca Eaton, Lynn Horsford	Won	
Series 5 (1996)	Primetime Emmy Awards	Outstanding Lead Actress in a Miniseries or a Special	Helen Mirren	Nominated	
Series 6 (2003)	British Academy Television Awards	Best Drama Serial	David Boulter, Peter Berry, Tom Hooper	Nominated	
Series 6 (2003)	British Academy Television Awards	Best Actress	Helen Mirren	Nominated	
Series 6 (2003)	British Academy Television Craft Awards	Editing – Fiction/Entertainment	St John O'Rorke	Nominated	
Series 6 (2003)	British Academy Television Craft Awards	Best Sound – Fiction/Entertainment	Simon Okin, Ben Baird, Nick Roberts	Nominated	
Series 6 (2003)	Primetime Emmy Awards	Outstanding Miniseries or Movie	David Boulter, Rebecca Eaton, Andy Harries	Nominated	
Series 6 (2003)	Primetime Emmy Awards	Outstanding Lead Actress in a Miniseries or Movie	Helen Mirren	Nominated	
Series 6 (2003)	Primetime Emmy Awards	Outstanding Directing for a Miniseries Movie or a Dramatic Special	Tom Hooper	Nominated	
Series 6 (2003)	Edgar Awards	Best TV Feature or Miniseries	Peter Berry	Nominated	
Series 6 (2003)	Royal Television Society Craft & Design Awards	Make Up Design - Drama	David Myers	Nominated	
Series 7 (2006)	British Academy Television Awards	Best Drama Serial	Andrew Benson, Philip Martin, Frank Deasy, Andy Harries	Nominated	
Series 7 (2006)	British Academy Television Craft Awards	Best Writing	Frank Deasy	Nominated	
Series 7 (2006)	British Academy Television Craft Awards	Best Original Music	Nicholas Hooper	Won	
Series 7 (2006)	British Academy Television Craft Awards	Best Editing – Fiction/Entertainment	Trevor Waite	Nominated	
Series 7 (2006)	Primetime Emmy Awards	Outstanding Miniseries or Movie	Andrew Benson, Philip Martin, Frank Deasy, Andy Harries	Nominated	
Series 7 (2006)	Primetime Emmy Awards	Outstanding Lead Actress in a Miniseries or Movie	Helen Mirren	Won	
Series 7 (2006)	Primetime Emmy Awards	Outstanding Writing for a Miniseries or Movie	Frank Deasy	Won	
Series 7 (2006)	Primetime Emmy Awards	Outstanding Directing for a Miniseries or Movie	Philip Martin	Won	
Series 7 (2006)	Golden Globe Awards	Best Miniseries or Television Film	Andrew Benson, Philip Martin, Frank Deasy, Andy Harries	Nominated	
Series 7 (2006)	Golden Globe Awards	Best Actress – Miniseries or Television Film	Helen Mirren	Nominated	
Series 7 (2006)	Royal Television Society Awards	Drama Serial	Prime Suspect	Nominated	
Series 7 (2006)	Royal Television Society Awards	Best Actor - Female	Helen Mirren	Won	

=== Influence on other programmes ===
Many observers have viewed Prime Suspect as the inspiration for female characters in American TV series, particularly noting strong similarities between this series in general—and the character of Jane Tennison in particular—and the later American series The Closer, starring Kyra Sedgwick in the role of Deputy Chief of Police Brenda Leigh Johnson. Critics noted the similarities between the series in a stronger way during the first seasons of The Closer, with one 2006 article in USA Today calling The Closer "an unofficial Americanization" of the British series, and a later reviewer noting that, "When The Closer was first shown, critics were quick to compare it to Prime Suspect...[and] there's something in that...."

In interviews Sedgwick has acknowledged that The Closer owes "a debt" to Prime Suspect, and that her admiration for that show and for Mirren were factors that first interested her in the role. According to Sedgwick, Prime Suspect was one of the shows that "paved the way" for The Closer, and her manager got her interested in the series by saying that it was "a little bit like Prime Suspect." Sedgwick is quoted as saying that the Tennison character did become her inspiration in some ways for her portrayal of Brenda Leigh Johnson.

Reviewers in American papers, including the Christian Science Monitor, have noted that The Closer, while not a direct remake of the British series, "owes" much to it, or that it "echoes many of the elements" of it. One The New York Times article refers to The Closer as a "direct descendant" of Prime Suspect, although less hard-hitting than the original:

There is one show, however, that is a direct descendant, however different its tone might be: The Closer, on which Kyra Sedgwick’s Deputy Chief Brenda Leigh Johnson obsesses over her cases, tramples feelings and battles the old-boy network. Her vice, however, is candy; no booze or one-night stands. If you want the hard stuff, you need to head back to Prime Suspect.

Other reviewers have also made the point that the differences between Tennison and Johnson are as important as their similarities:

But then there's the locker-room pissiness of her [Johnson's] all-male department, which she navigates like an estrogen version of Prime Suspect's Jane Tennison. (That's not a running gag error, either: Sedgwick plays Johnson as if her toughness, intelligence and wit blossomed naturally from her Southern femininity, whereas Helen Mirren plays the dogged Tennison as if womanhood were a liability.)

NBC picked up an adaptation of the British series for the 2011–2012 season. It was taken off the schedule after 13 episodes were produced.

=== Spoofs ===
In 1997, a short spoof episode Prime Cracker was produced for the BBC's biennial Red Nose Day charity telethon in aid of Comic Relief. A crossover with ITV stablemate crime drama Cracker, the spoof starred Mirren and Cracker lead Robbie Coltrane as their characters from the respective series, sending up the perceived ultra-seriousness of both shows.

Dead Ringers featured a parody with Queen Elizabeth II in the lead role, as a reaction to Helen Mirren's portrayal of her in the 2006 film The Queen.

== Prequel series ==
A six-part prequel, Prime Suspect 1973, was announced in 2015 by ITV, based on the book Tennison by Lynda La Plante, adapted by Glen Laker. It tells the story of a 22-year-old Jane Tennison as a probationary WPC in Hackney, London, investigating her first murder case. The series began airing on 2 March 2017. The role of Tennison is played by Stefanie Martini. In June 2017, ITV confirmed that the series had not been recommissioned for a second series.

== Home media ==
On 1 October 2013, Netflix made the Series 1–6 available online for streaming. On 27 August 2013, Acorn Media released the entire series in a seven-disc Blu-ray Disc set. Each disc contains the individual programme, upscaled to 1080p HD and converted to 16:9 Widescreen (apart from season 4 episode 1 which remains in 4:3 aspect ratio). Bonus material includes a 50-minute behind-the-scenes special, a 23-minute Series 6 behind-the-scenes featurette, a photo gallery and cast filmographies.

The DVD format of the series was released in 2010 by ITV Studios/Global entertainment. It has an overall running time of 1,437 minutes approximately, and encompasses ten discs, with each Series set on one disc except the triple-episode Series 4, which is set over three discs. As with the Blu-ray production, the final disc contains a Behind-the-Scenes of Series 7.
