= Awake and Sing! =

Drama by American playwright Clifford Odets

- Playbill title page, Belasco Theatre, 1935
- Original language: English
- Written by: Clifford Odets
- Subject: A family struggles for survival amongst harsh conditions.
- Genre: Drama
- Setting: The Bronx

Premiere
- Date: February 19, 1935
- Place: Belasco Theatre; New York City, New York, United States

Awake and Sing! is a drama play written by American playwright Clifford Odets. The play was initially produced by The Group Theatre in 1935.

== Summary and characters ==
The play is set in The Bronx borough of New York City, New York. It concerns the impoverished Berger family, who all live under one roof, and their conflicts as the parents scheme to manipulate their children's relationships to their own ends, while their children strive for their own dreams.

The audience is introduced to a unique family. The matriarch of the family, Bessie, had high hopes and dreams for her family; however, despite her hopefulness, her largest fear is that her family will lose their home and all their possessions. This fear stems from a woman down the street who had this exact thing happen to her.

The household consists of extended family such as Bessie's father, Jacob, her husband Myron, and their son Ralph, 21, and spinster daughter Hennie, 26. To top it all off, in order to ease the financial burden on the family, the Bergers have taken in Sam, an immigrant boarder.

Besides the desire for financial stability, there are other problems that the Bergers face, such as Hennie's unwanted pregnancy. To avoid this burden on the family, Bessie insists on the marriage between Hennie and the new immigrant boarder in order to save her family's reputation and her daughter's life. Hennie has no love for Sam. The family has very different views on the arranged marriage between Hennie and Sam. For example, Ralph, a more philosophical character of the play, is not in agreement with his mother's decision. Ralph very much resembles his grandfather who is an idealist. The Berger house is therefore divided into idealists and realists, much like society as a whole.

In a turn of events, Jacob commits suicide after making Ralph the beneficiary of his life insurance policy, in hopes that this will give Ralph the freedom for which he yearns.

Themes

Odets brings to the table the issues of the importance of appearances in relation to respectability in society - how we appear to society is how we improve and gain status - as well as the contrasting worlds of idealism and realism. Odets also presents the contrasting of materialistic ideals and the importance of money in society. Through his writing, he zooms in on the economic burden that is placed on society and how it affects the lives of humans and the way they live their lives. He also shows how values can become blurred and perceptions can change with experience.

=== Characters ===
- Myron Berger – the father of the family
- Bessie Berger – his wife
- Hennie Berger – their daughter, age 26
- Ralph Berger – their son, age 21
- Uncle Morty – Bessie's brother, a successful businessman
- Jacob – father of Bessie and Morty; a Marxist; he lives with the Bergers
- Moe Axelrod – a friend of the family who eventually boards with the Bergers
- Sam Feinschreiber – an immigrant who courts Hennie
- Schlosser – the janitor in the Bergers' apartment building

== Productions ==
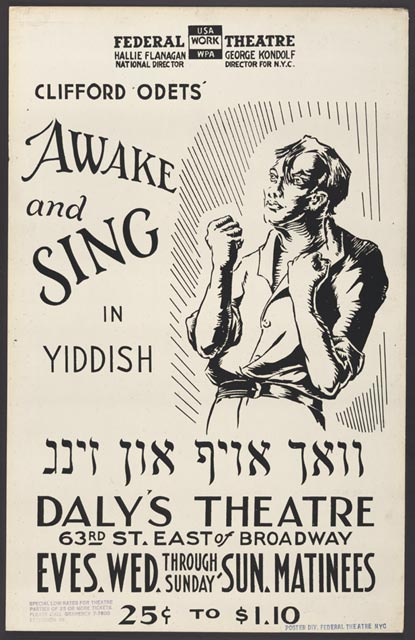
Federal Theater Project WPA Yiddish language production

The play premiered on Broadway at the Belasco Theatre on February 19, 1935, running for 184 performances before closing on July 27, 1935; it returned two months later on September 9 for an additional 24 performances through September 28, 1935. Directed by Harold Clurman, the cast starred Luther Adler (Moe Axelrod), Stella Adler (Bessie Berger), Morris Carnovsky (Jacob), John Garfield (Ralph Berger) and Sanford Meisner (Sam Feinschreiber).

In January 1941, the play was the first production of Glasgow Unity Theatre.

It was revived in 1961 at the Teatro Oficina, São Paulo, Brazil.

It was revived off-Broadway in 1970, 1979, 1993 and 1995. It was revived on Broadway in 1938, 1939, 1984 and 2006.

A Lincoln Center Theater production on Broadway at the Belasco Theatre, opening on April 17, 2006, and closing on June 25, 2006, after 80 performances and 27 previews, won the Tony Award for Best Revival of a Play. Directed by Bartlett Sher, the cast featured Ben Gazzara (Jacob), Zoë Wanamaker (Bessie), Mark Ruffalo (Moe), Pablo Schreiber (Ralph) and Lauren Ambrose (Hennie). Gazzara and Ruffalo repeated their roles (with Sher directing) in a 2010 L.A. Theatre Works recording of the play that also starred Jane Kaczmarek.

Directed by Robert Hopkins and Norman Lloyd, Awake and Sing! premiered on PBS on March 6, 1972. This film production of the play features Walter Matthau (Moe), Ruth Storey (Bessie), Felicia Farr (Hennie), Robert Lipton (Ralph), Leo Fuchs (Jacob), Milton Selzer (Myron), Martin Ritt (Uncle Morty), Ron Rifkin (Sam) and John Myhers (Schlosser).

It was produced at the Oregon Shakespeare Festival in Ashland, Oregon, in 1996.

In 2006, Arena Stage in Washington, D.C., produced the show with director (and Arena's founding artistic director) Zelda Fichandler in a production featuring Robert Prosky as Jacob, and featuring the adoption of Yiddish in the script that conforms to Odets's earlier version of the play, titled I Got the Blues.

Following its American success in revivals, the play was staged in London at the Off-West End Almeida Theatre from August 31, 2007, through October 20, 2007. Directed by Michael Attenborough, the cast featured Stockard Channing as Bessie.

The play opened in Toronto, Ontario, on June 6, 2009, for a two-month run at the Soulpepper Theatre Company.

The National Asian American Theatre Company in New York produced the play from August to September 2013 at the SoHo Walker Space. It won an Obie Award for Mia Katigbak as Bessie Berger. In 2015, The New York Public Theater with National Asian-American Theatre Company presented a production with a cast completely of Asian descent under the direction of Stephen Brown-Fried. It was led by Mia Katigbak and received a Drama League nomination for Outstanding Revival. It also played at The Public Theatre as part of National Asian American Theatre Company's 25th Anniversary.

In 2014, a production at the Olney Theatre Center for the Arts in Olney, Maryland, was directed by Serge Seiden and featured Rick Foucheux as Jacob and Naomi Jacobsen as Bessie Berger. Also in 2014, a production at Boston's Huntington Theater Company was directed by Melia Bensussen.

In 2019, Quintessence Theatre Group in Philadelphia, Pennsylvania, presented a production starring Lawrence Pressman as Jacob. The production was nominated for two Barrymore Awards, including one for Pressman for Outstanding Supporting Performance in a Play.

The play will receive its fifth Broadway revival as part of the Manhattan Theatre Club's 2026-2027 season in a production starring Danny Burstein (Uncle Morty), Jessica Hecht (Bessie Berger), and Jeremy Shamos (Myron Berger) and directed by Tyne Rafaeli. The production will begin performances at the Samuel J. Friedman Theatre on December 15, 2026 ahead of an official opening on January 7, 2027; exact dates are currently to be announced. Micaela Diamond and Will Pullen will join the cast as Hennie Berger and Ralph Berger.

== Awards and nominations ==
=== Tony Awards (2006) ===
- Best Revival of a Play (win)
- Best Costume Design of a Play (win)
- Best Lighting Design of a Play (nomination)
- Best Scenic Design of a Play (nomination)
- Best Direction of a Play (nomination)
- Featured Actress – Zoe Wanamaker (nomination)
- Featured Actor – Mark Ruffalo (nomination) and Pablo Schreiber (nomination)

=== Drama Desk Awards (2006) ===
- Outstanding Revival of a Play (win)
- Outstanding Set Design of a Play (win)
- Outstanding Ensemble Performance (win)
- Outstanding Lighting Design (nomination)
