= Jonathan Smith (politician) =

American politician

Member of the New Hampshire House of Representatives from the Carroll 5th district
- Incumbent
- Assumed office December 2, 2020
- Preceded by: Ed Comeau
- Succeeded by: Steven Brown (elect)

Personal details
- Party: Republican

Jonathan Smith is an American politician. He serves as a Republican member for the Carroll 5th district of the New Hampshire House of Representatives.
