= The Countess Alice =

1992 drama film by Moira Armstrong

- Genre: Drama
- Written by: Allan Cubitt
- Directed by: Moira Armstrong
- Starring: Wendy Hiller; Zoë Wanamaker; Duncan Bell
- Theme music composer: Ilona Sekacz
- Country of origin: United Kingdom
- Original languages: English; German

Production
- Executive producer: George Faber
- Producer: Colin Ludlow
- Cinematography: John Daly
- Running time: 81 minutes

Original release
- Network: BBC 2, WGBH-Boston
- Release: 24 January 1993

The Countess Alice is a 1992 BBC made for television drama film directed by Moira Armstrong and features Wendy Hiller, Zoë Wanamaker and Duncan Bell. This was Wendy Hiller's last film role. It was made with the support of WGBH-Boston and shown on the American PBS network in 1993. It was written by Allan Cubitt as part of the BBC ScreenPlay anthology TV series.

== Synopsis ==
In 1935 a young English society woman caused a stir by marrying a German aristocrat and moving to live with him in Germany. Many decades later, shortly after German reunification, her daughter decides to make a trip to the family's former estate in East Germany. However, she discovers the grave of a child with her name in the family plot. Back in Britain, she forces a confession from her mother that she is not her natural daughter. The 'real' Konstanza had been shot by the invading Russians, and the Countess had been forced to take the daughter of a dying couple to save the child's life. She is unable to recall anything about Connie's real background. A breach between the two women is followed by a reconciliation.

== Cast ==
- Wendy Hiller as Countess Alice von Holzendorf
- Zoë Wanamaker as Connie
- Duncan Bell as Nick Black
- Patricia Quinn as Margot
- Lucinda Fisher as Jane
- Sylvia Barter as Tilly
- Madge Ryan as Beattie
- Martin Wimbush as Jeremy
- Terence Donovan as himself
- Sarah Crowden as Sarah
- Jan Van Hool as Vivian
- Wolf Kahler as Werner
- Carl Duering as German Taxi Driver

== Critical reception ==
The New York Times described the story as "fragile and not entirely persuasive, but many of the details are skillfully observed," with praise for Hiller: "Miss Hiller has rarely failed to impress, but her recent performances have assumed an even higher level of authority. The voice is more commanding, the bearing more regal. The effect can be quite astonishing." Thomas Sutcliffe of The Independent called the plotting "rather casual", and praised both Wanamaker and Hiller, also writing "So coercive was the direction in this respect that I was readying myself to laugh at the climactic encounter out of sheer cussedness; that I couldn't was down to Hiller's delicate persuasion and Wanamaker's compelling display of grief."
