= Ed Comeau (politician) =

American politician

Member of New Hampshire House of Representatives for Carroll 5
- In office December 3, 2014 – December 2, 2020
- Succeeded by: Jonathan Smith

Personal details
- Party: Republican

Ed Comeau is an American politician. He was a member of the New Hampshire House of Representatives and represented Carroll's 5th district.

In 2010, Comeau moved to New Hampshire as part of the Free State Project.
