= Sherlock Holmes and the Case of the Silk Stocking =

2004 television film directed by Simon Cellan Jones

- Written by: Allan Cubitt
- Directed by: Simon Cellan Jones
- Starring: Rupert Everett; Ian Hart; Jonathan Hyde; Eleanor David; Helen McCrory; Neil Dudgeon
- Music by: Adrian Johnston
- Country of origin: United Kingdom
- Original language: English

Production
- Producer: Elinor Day
- Cinematography: David Katznelson
- Editor: Paul Garrick
- Running time: 99 minutes
- Production companies: BBC; Tiger Aspect Productions

Original release
- Network: BBC One
- Release: 26 December 2004

Related
- The Hound of the Baskervilles

Sherlock Holmes and the Case of the Silk Stocking is a British television film originally broadcast on BBC One in the United Kingdom on 26 December 2004. Produced by Tiger Aspect Productions, it was written by Allan Cubitt and was a sequel to the same company's adaptation of The Hound of the Baskervilles, made for the BBC two years previously. Although Silk Stocking retained the same Dr. Watson, Ian Hart, this time the character of Sherlock Holmes was played by Rupert Everett.

== Plot ==
In November 1903, young women are being killed in London, each with a silk stocking stuffed down her throat. Watson seeks help from the retired and disenchanted Holmes, who determines that the victims are well-born ladies, not prostitutes. Evidence found includes a thumbprint, a pair of ladies' dancing shoes, broken glass, a strong smell of chloroform and a silk stocking removed from a victim's gullet. It seems that the killer has a foot fetish.

Holmes questions a survivor – a young girl who was apparently set free by her captor because she has a club foot – and arranges for her to "accidentally" see the footman that he suspects is the killer, despite his ironclad alibis. The girl identifies him as her kidnapper, but the thumbprint clears the suspect. Holmes then baits a trap for the killer: he uses the sister of a victim and has her perform in a classical tableau at an event attended by the King and Queen. Her Grecian-Roman costume is revealing, and her sandals expose her feet. After the performance, she walks away to be alone; the suspect drugs her and is quickly caught by Holmes and placed in custody. The sister returns home and is tucked into bed by her father.

However, the suspect's thumbprint doesn't match the evidence. Holmes suspects the killer has an identical twin, and that the real killer is still on the loose. Holmes telephones the father of the "bait" sister to warn him, but the real killer has kidnapped her from her bed just minutes earlier. The viewer sees the killer carrying her over his shoulder as blood drips from her face, where he cut her with broken glass.

The police force the other twin to lead them to his brother, but he escapes the police. Holmes finds the killer and his victim just in time; the young woman has a silk stocking tied around her neck, and Watson has to cut it and perform something that looks like CPR, which was known in similar form from the late-18th century but did not come into standardised common usage until the mid-20th century. Holmes gets the killer twin to confess that he wanted his victims' attention, because they looked at him while in captivity. Both twins are then taken into custody.

At the end, Watson marries his fiancée Jenny Vandeleur, an American psychoanalyst who had aided in the investigation. They leave on honeymoon, and Holmes is left sitting alone at the table.

== Cast ==
- Rupert Everett as Sherlock Holmes
- Ian Hart as Dr. Watson
- Nicholas Palliser as Dr. Dunwoody
- Neil Dudgeon as Lestrade
- Anne Carroll as Mrs Hudson
- Tamsin Egerton as Miranda Helhoughton
- Perdita Weeks as Roberta Massingham
- Jennifer Moule as Georgina Massingham
- Eleanor David as Mary Pentney
- John Cunningham as Bates
- Michael Fassbender as Charles Allen
- Jonathan Hyde as George Pentney
- Helen McCrory as Mrs. Jenny Vandeleur
- Julian Wadham as Hugo Massingham
- Penny Downey as Judith Massingham
- Roger Monk as Workman
- Jonathan Emmett as Policeman
- Max Harvey as Master of Ceremonies
- Andy Wisher as Constable
- Guy Henry as Mr. Bilney
- Rachel Hurd-Wood as Imogen Helhoughton
- Kristine Kavanaugh as Lady Helhoughton
- Gina Beck as Maid

== Production ==
=== Development ===
Some co-production funding for the drama was provided by United States PBS broadcaster WGBH, and it was later shown on PBS's Masterpiece Theatre in 2005. The original title for the production was Sherlock Holmes and the Deadly Season, the name being changed only a few weeks before transmission. While Ian Hart returned from the earlier The Hound of the Baskervilles film, in this film Rupert Everett replaced Richard Roxburgh as Sherlock Holmes. Guy Henry who had earlier portrayed Sherlock Holmes in Young Sherlock: The Mystery of the Manor House was cast in the minor role of Mr. Bilney.

Directed by Simon Cellan Jones, the production filmed in and around London in late summer 2003. The musical score is by Adrian Johnston.

The book given to Holmes by Mrs Vandeleur is Psychopathia Sexualis.

=== Writing ===
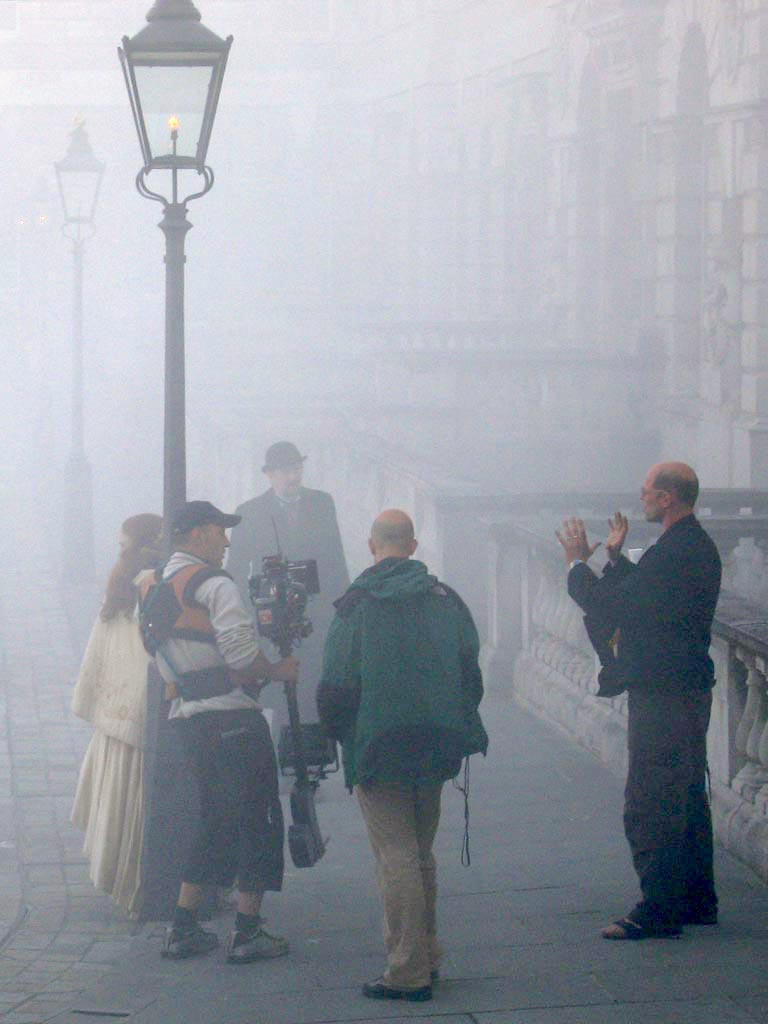
Filming on location at Somerset House for Sherlock Holmes and the Case of the Silk Stocking

Unlike Baskervilles, this production was an original story written by Allan Cubitt, although the script used some lines of dialogue for Holmes taken from Arthur Conan Doyle's original stories. Set in the early 1900s, Cubitt provided Watson with a new wife and indicates that it had been some time since he and Holmes last worked together.

"This is a departure," said Rebecca Eaton, executive producer for WGBH in Boston, which produced the show with the BBC and Tiger Aspect Productions. "That's what we say at PBS when we don't know what is going to happen. We could be arrested by the Conan Doyle police - or at least severely reprimanded - because we are departing from the canon."

== Reception ==
Reviews of the drama were generally mixed. "I did feel that this peculiar tale was intended to tickle American tootsies," Nancy Banks-Smith wrote in The Guardian. "The king was announced as 'King Edward the Seventh', Dr Watson married a Yankee psychiatrist [psychoanalyst], the duchess was having an affair with the footman, well, two as it turned out, and the London fog never lifted."

The film had a rating of 75 out of 100 on Metacritic in 2014. Robert Bianco of USA Today remarked, "Everett sticks close enough to the outline created by Arthur Conan Doyle to be recognizably Sherlockian, and yet he deviates enough to create an amusing character all his own." Dorothy Rabinowitz of the Wall Street Journal wrote, "Everett carries the role of the master detective off with dispatch—a portrayal rich in tortured silences and seasoned with touches of campy authority." Marilyn Stasio, writing for The Daily Telegraph, called Everett's interpretation "elegant and decidedly decadent".

Melanie McFarland of the Seattle Post-Intelligencer said, "The Case of the Silk Stocking contains more than the usual share of pedestrian turns of phrase, and Neil Dudgeon's Inspector Lestrade is less than an afterthought here. Everett makes up for it with a haunting portrayal." Brian Lowry of Variety wrote, "The Case of the Silk Stocking is a rather wan addition to the Holmes filmography, yet respectable enough in showcasing the character's cerebral charms. If push comes to shove, though, when all the revisionism's done, I prefer my Holmes in black-and-white."

The Daily Telegraph rated Everett as number 12 on their 20 greatest Sherlock Holmes.

== DVD release ==
The film was released on DVD in 2005, with an audio commentary by Cellan Jones and producer Elinor Day.
