= The Boys Are Back (film) =

- Theatrical release poster
- Directed by: Scott Hicks
- Written by: Allan Cubitt
- Produced by: Greg Brenman; Tim White; Bella Wright
- Starring: Clive Owen; Emma Booth; Laura Fraser; George MacKay; Nicholas McAnulty
- Cinematography: Greig Fraser
- Edited by: Scott Gray
- Music by: Hal Lindes
- Production companies: BBC Films; Tiger Aspect Pictures; Screen Australia; South Australian Film Corporation; Hopscotch Productions; Southern Light Films
- Distributed by: Miramax Films (United States and United Kingdom; through Walt Disney Studios Motion Pictures); Hopscotch Films (Australia)
- Release dates: 15 September 2009 (TIFF); 12 November 2009 (Australia); 22 January 2010 (United Kingdom); 26 January 2010 (United States)
- Running time: 104 minutes
- Countries: Australia; United Kingdom; United States
- Language: English
- Box office: $3.1 million

The Boys Are Back is a 2009 drama film directed by Scott Hicks, produced by Greg Brenman and starring Clive Owen. It is based on the 2001 memoir, The Boys Are Back in Town, by Simon Carr.

== Plot ==
Joe Warr is a top sportswriter from England, now in Australia, living in an isolated homestead on the Fleurieu Peninsula near Adelaide in South Australia, with his second wife Katy and their young son Artie. In leisure hours Joe's relationship with his son is more like a big brother — they play boisterous, possibly dangerous, games together. The homestead is ideal for a bright energetic young boy — it has a treehouse, flying fox and swimming pool. Katy is diagnosed with cancer and dies, forcing Joe to cope with the responsibilities of being a single parent.

Joe's teenage son from his first marriage, Harry, flies in during "hols" from his boarding-school in England (Joe's alma mater). Harry is resentful, believing he had been abandoned by his father, and now by his mother. He feels out of place in the freedom of this strange informal home with a new rambunctious brother and a father he barely remembers. Joe tries to establish a relationship, hold down his job, and run a household, and falling short in each. Help comes from Laura, a single mother who helps out at Artie's primary school, and Katy's parents, who run a vineyard closer to Adelaide. He cheats at his job by writing about what he sees at home on his TV screen rather that attending the events.

The crisis comes when he is obliged to join a team reporting at the Rod Laver Arena. Laura, who is disappointed with the way her relationship with Joe is heading, refuses point-blank to babysit, and Katy's mother can't help as it's harvest time and she needs to supervise the grape-pickers. Harry, who has begun to feel at home and act responsibly, assures his father that they can manage alone for the two days he is away. Despite misgivings, Joe flies off to Melbourne. That evening, one of Harry's new-found friends invite the brothers to a beach party, which they attend. They return home without incident, but a group of the party-goers, intent on "playing on", rock up and play havoc in the house and grounds. Harry tries to phone for help but his phone is playfully whisked away.

From his hotel room in Melbourne, Joe tries ringing home but gets no answer, so frantically gets on the next plane back to Adelaide. Arriving home, he finds the house unlocked and the place a mess. Harry has used his return ticket back to London and Artie is with his grandmother, who is furious at Joe's irresponsibility.

Joe and Artie fly to England to reconcile with Harry, but he won't see them. His old feeling had returned — that his father deliberately left him with his mother when they divorced. Joe tries to tell him otherwise, that he had been thinking of what was best for the child, but his words are lost.

Joe and Artie are about to board the train for Heathrow, when suddenly Artie is missing — he has spotted Harry, who has gained his mother's permission to live with his father.

== Cast ==
- Clive Owen as Joe Warr
- Emma Booth as Laura
- Laura Fraser as Katy
- George MacKay as Harry
- Nicholas McAnulty as Artie
- Julia Blake as Barbara
- Chris Haywood as Tom
- Erik Thomson as Digby
- Natasha Little as Flick
- Emma Lung as Mia
- Alexandra Schepisi as Mother
- Adam Morgan as Journalist
- Tommy Bastow as Ben
- Luke O'Loughlin as Bree
- Anni Finsterer as Tennis journalist
- Nathan Page as Headbutter

== Production ==
The script of The Boys Are Back was based on the 2001 memoir, The Boys Are Back in Town, by Simon Carr, adapted by Allan Cubitt.

The film was directed by Scott Hicks, co-produced by Greg Brenman, Tim White, and Bella Wright, and stars Clive Owen. It features a score composed by Hal Lindes as well as music from Sigur Ros, Elbow and Ray LaMontagne.

== Release ==
The film was released in the United Kingdom on 22 January 2010.

It was distributed by Hopscotch Films in Australia.

== Reception ==
The film holds a 73% approval rating on Rotten Tomatoes based on 126 reviews, with an average rating of 6.30/10. The website's critics' consensus reads: "Great performances by Clive Owen and The Boys save this melodrama from entering into the sappy territory it might have in less competent hands."

== Box office ==
The Boys Are Back grossed A$2,117,064 at the box office in Australia, and US$809,752 in the United States, grossing US$3,185,839 worldwide.

== See also ==
- Cinema of Australia
- Cinema of New Zealand
- Cinema of the UK
