= Anna Karenina (2000 TV series) =

British television series

- Genre: Period drama
- Based on: Anna Karenina by Leo Tolstoy
- Written by: Allan Cubitt
- Directed by: David Blair
- Starring: Helen McCrory; Kevin McKidd; Stephen Dillane; Mark Strong; Amanda Root; Douglas Henshall; Paloma Baeza; Abigail Cruttenden; Paul Rhys; Gillian Barge; Malcolm Sinclair; Victoria Carling
- Composer: John E. Keane
- Country of origin: United Kingdom
- Original language: English
- No. of series: 1
- No. of episodes: 4

Production
- Executive producers: George Faber; Allan Cubitt; Rebecca Eaton; Charles Pattinson; Suzan Harrison
- Producer: Matthew Bird
- Production companies: Company Pictures; WGBH Boston

Original release
- Network: Channel 4
- Release: 9 May – 30 May 2000

Anna Karenina is a four-part British television adaptation of Leo Tolstoy's 1877 novel of the same name.

It was directed by David Blair and aired in the United Kingdom on Channel 4 from 9 to 30 May 2000 and in America on PBS Masterpiece Theatre in 2001.

== Plot ==
Anna is travelling by train from St. Petersburg to Moscow to visit her brother, Stiva. Stiva is married to Dolly; however, he has been having an affair with the governess of his children and needs Anna's help to repair his marriage.

Anna too is married, to Karenin, an important official, with an 8-year-old son. At the end of the journey she meets Count Vronsky, the son of her travelling companion on the train, and in due course she and Vronsky begin an affair.

In the meantime, Stiva's friend Constantine Levin courts Dolly's younger sister Kitty. Levin and Kitty are both unmarried. But Kitty is initially attracted to Vronsky and rejects Levin's first proposal; he leaves Moscow and returns to his farm in the countryside.

Nikolai, Constantine Levin's brother, cohabits with a former prostitute named Masha and is constantly in debt.

== Cast ==
- Helen McCrory as Anna
- Kevin McKidd as Vronsky
- Stephen Dillane as Karenin
- Mark Strong as Stiva
- Amanda Root as Dolly
- Douglas Henshall as Levin (Constantine "Kostya")
- Paloma Baeza as Kitty
- Abigail Cruttenden as Betsy
- Paul Rhys as Nikolai
- Gillian Barge as Princess Shcherbatskaya
- Malcolm Sinclair as Prince Shcherbatsky
- Victoria Carling as Annushka
- Tom Ward as Yashvin

== Reception ==
It received a positive review from Mark Lawson in The Guardian.
