= Steve Brown =

Steve Brown may refer to:

== Music ==
- Steve Brown (bass player) (1890–1965), American jazz double bassist with the New Orleans Rhythm Kings
- Steve Brown (guitarist) (born 1942), American jazz guitarist with Chuck Israels' band
- Steve Brown (composer) (1954–2024), British television music composer

== Sports ==
- Steve Brown (American football) (born 1960), American football player
- Steve Brown (hurdler) (born 1969), Trinidad and Tobago hurdler
- Steve Brown (baseball) (born 1957), American baseball player
- Steve Brown (cricketer) (born 1963), New Zealand cricketer
- Steve Brown (curler) (born 1947), American curler and coach
- Steve Brown (darts player, born 1962), English-American darts player
- Steve Brown (darts player, born 1981), English darts player
- Steve Brown (footballer, born 1961), Scottish footballer
- Steve Brown (footballer, born 1966), English footballer
- Steve Brown (footballer, born 1972), English footballer
- Steve Brown (footballer, born 1973), English footballer
- Steve Brown (ice hockey) (born 1965), Canadian former professional ice hockey and roller hockey player
- Steve Brown (wheelchair rugby) (born 1981), British wheelchair rugby player, Paralympian and TV presenter
- Steve Brown (high jumper), winner of the 1967 NCAA DI outdoor high jump championship
- Steve Alvarez Brown, British influencer and racing driver

== Other ==
- Stephen D. M. Brown, (born 1955), British scientist
- Steve Brown (author), American pastor, syndicated radio host, and seminary professor
- Steve Brown (yo-yo player) (born 1976), American yo-yo player

== See also ==
- Stevie Brown (born 1987), American National Football League safety
- Stephen Brown (disambiguation)
