= The Hound of the Baskervilles (2002 film) =

2002 film directed by David Attwood

- Genre: Mystery; Crime thriller
- Based on: The Hound of the Baskervilles by Arthur Conan Doyle
- Written by: Allan Cubitt
- Directed by: David Attwood
- Starring: Richard Roxburgh; Ian Hart; Richard E. Grant
- Country of origin: United Kingdom
- Original language: English

Production
- Running time: 100 minutes
- Production company: Tiger Aspect Productions

Original release
- Network: BBC One
- Release: 26 December 2002

The Hound of the Baskervilles is a 2002 British mystery crime thriller television film directed by David Attwood and based on Sir Arthur Conan Doyle's 1902 novel of the same name, adapted for the screen by Allan Cubitt. The film stars Richard Roxburgh as Sherlock Holmes and Ian Hart as Doctor Watson. Produced by Tiger Aspect Productions, this was the third adaptation of the tale for the BBC, it was shown on BBC One on 26 December 2002, where it was watched by an audience of 7.58 million viewers after seven days.

== Plot ==
Sherlock Holmes and his companion Dr Watson investigate the case of the legend of a fearsome, diabolical hound of supernatural origin on Dartmoor in Devon in England's West Country.

== Cast ==
- Richard Roxburgh as Sherlock Holmes
- Ian Hart as Doctor Watson
- Richard E. Grant as Jack Stapleton
- Matt Day as Sir Henry Baskerville
- John Nettles as Dr. James Mortimer
- Geraldine James as Mrs. Mortimer
- Neve McIntosh as Beryl Stapleton
- Ron Cook as Mr. Barrymore
- Liza Tarbuck as Mrs. Barrymore
- Danny Webb as Inspector Lestrade

== Production ==
Ian Hart, who plays Watson, would play him again in the 2004 TV film Sherlock Holmes and the Case of the Silk Stocking, also written by Cubitt. The hound was a mix of animatronics and computer generated images and was created by the same team, Crawley Creatures and Framestore, that provided the dinosaurs for Walking with Dinosaurs and The Lost World.

This version diverges from the novel in a few instances, such as Sir Henry not being involved in the final attempt to entrap Stapleton, Stapleton murdering his wife and Stapleton being shot dead by Watson just before the former can shoot a mire-trapped Holmes. The film is set in the time period the original tale was published as opposed to when it was originally set. It portrays a séance performed by Dr. Mortimer's wife, a scene which did not appear in the original novel, though a similar scene did appear in the 1939 Basil Rathbone version of the film. The characters of Frankland and his daughter Laura Lyons are completely omitted from the film.

== Critical reaction ==
Richard Scheib of The Science-Fiction, Horror and Fantasy Film Review called the film "one of the best Sherlock Holmes screen adaptations to date, and arguably the best of all screen versions of The Hound of the Baskervilles that we have." Pamela Troy of CultureVulture.net wrote, "There's a lot that may outrage fans of the original novel, but this is, nonetheless, a respectful, interesting, and worthwhile adaptation." Charles Prepolec of the Sherlock Holmes fansite BakerStreetDozen.com wrote, "In the end, it is a compelling, if somewhat infuriating, film to watch. Not a great Holmes film, and certainly not the greatest version of this story, but it is fascinating television drama." The A.V. Club called the film "A very interesting, if not completely successful, adaptation."
