= Lark Rise to Candleford (TV series) =

BBC TV drama series, 2008–2011

- Genre: Period drama
- Created by: Bill Gallagher
- Based on: Lark Rise to Candleford trilogy by Flora Thompson
- Narrated by: Sarah Lancashire
- Composer: Julian Nott
- Country of origin: United Kingdom
- Original language: English
- No. of series: 4
- No. of episodes: 40

Production
- Executive producers: Bill Gallagher; Susan Hogg
- Producers: Grainne Marmion (Series 1); Ann Tricklebank (Series 2–4)
- Production locations: Box, Corsham and Lockeridge, Wiltshire
- Running time: 60 minutes

Original release
- Network: BBC One; BBC HD
- Release: 13 January 2008 – 13 February 2011

Lark Rise to Candleford is a British television period drama series, adapted by the BBC from Flora Thompson's trilogy of semi-autobiographical novels about the English countryside, published between 1939 and 1943. The first episode aired on 13 January 2008 on BBC One and BBC HD in the UK. In the U.S., the series began on select PBS stations in the spring of 2009. A third series began in the UK on 10 January 2010. The fourth and final series began on 9 January 2011 on BBC One and BBC One HD, and concluded on 13 February 2011.

== Premise ==
The series is set in the small Oxfordshire hamlet of Lark Rise, and the wealthier neighbouring market town of Candleford at the end of the 19th century, before the coming of the railway. The series chronicles the daily lives of farmworkers, craftsmen and gentry observing the characters in loving, boisterous and competing communities of families, rivals, friends and neighbours.

The story is seen through the eyes of a young girl, Laura Timmins (Olivia Hallinan), as she leaves Lark Rise to start a new life under the wing of her mother's cousin, the independent and effervescent Dorcas Lane (Julia Sawalha), who is postmistress at the local post office in Candleford. Through these two characters, viewers experience the force of friendship as Laura and Dorcas see each other through the best and worst of times.

== Cast ==
=== Main cast ===
Character	Portrayed by	Series			
Character	Portrayed by	1	2	3	4
Dorcas Lane	Julia Sawalha	Main	Main	Main	Main
Laura Timmins	Olivia Hallinan	Main	Main	Main	Main
Emma Timmins	Claudie Blakley	Main	Main	Main	Main
Robert Timmins	Brendan Coyle	Main	Main	Main	—N/a
Victoria May 'Queenie' Warrener Turrill	Linda Bassett	Main	Main	Main	Main
Thomas 'Twister' Turrill	Karl Johnson	Main	Main	Main	Main
Thomas Brown	Mark Heap	Main	Main	Main	Main
Margaret Ellison Brown	Sandy McDade	Recurring	Main	Main	Main
Caroline Arless	Dawn French	Main	Main	—N/a	Guest
Alf Arless	John Dagleish	Main	Main	Main	Main
Winifred 'Minnie' Mude	Ruby Bentall	—N/a	Main	Main	Main
Zillah	Liz Smith	Main	—N/a	—N/a	—N/a
Prudence "Pearl" Pratt	Matilda Ziegler	Main	Main	Main	Main
Ruth "Ruby" Pratt	Victoria Hamilton	Main	Main	Main	Main
Sir Timothy Midwinter	Ben Miles	Main	—N/a	—N/a	—N/a
Lady Adelaide Midwinter	Olivia Grant	Main	—N/a	Guest	—N/a
Phillip White	Oliver Jackson-Cohen	Main	—N/a	—N/a	—N/a
Mr. Paxton	Gerard Horan	Main	—N/a	—N/a	—N/a
Matthew Welby	Stephen Marcus	Main	—N/a	—N/a	—N/a
James Dowland	Jason Merrells	—N/a	Main	—N/a	—N/a
Nan Carter	Rebecca Night	—N/a	Main	—N/a	—N/a
Daniel Parish	Ben Aldridge	—N/a	—N/a	Main	Main
Gabriel Cochrane	Richard Harrington	—N/a	—N/a	—N/a	Main
Narrator (Adult Laura Timmins)	Sarah Lancashire	Recurring	Recurring	Recurring	Recurring
Edmund Timmins	Thomas Rhys Jones	Recurring	Recurring	Recurring	Recurring
Frank Timmins	Fergus Drysdale	Recurring	Recurring	Recurring	Recurring
Ethel Timmins	Martha Murdoch	Recurring	Recurring	Recurring	Recurring
Sally Arless	Sophie Miles	Recurring	Recurring	Recurring	Recurring
Lizzie Arless	Hope Yeomans	Recurring	Recurring	Recurring	Recurring
Archie Arless	Harry Miles	Recurring	Recurring	Recurring	—N/a
Sydney Dowland	Edward Darnell-Hayes	—N/a	Minor (Note: Played by Oscar Lloyd for one episode in Series 2)	Recurring	Recurring
Fisher Bloom	Matthew McNulty	—N/a	Recurring	Recurring	—N/a

=== Guest stars ===
- Lorraine Ashbourne as Lil Spicer (Series 2, 1 episode)
- Samantha Bond as Celestia Brice-Coulson (Series 2, 1 episode)
- Rosie Cavaliero as Bessie Mullins (Series 3, 1 episode)
- Camille Coduri as Patty (Series 1, 1 episode)
- Tom Conti as Mr. Reppington (Series 3, 1 episode)
- Ben Daniels as Mr. Rushton (Series 1, 1 episode)
- Phil Davis as Arthur Ashlow (Series 1, 1 episode)
- Oliver Dimsdale as George Ellison (Series 2, 4 episodes)
- Michelle Fairley as Elizabeth Patterson (Series 2, 10 episodes)
- Burn Gorman as Benedict Marley (Series 4, 1 episode)
- Nigel Harman as Samuel Braby (Series 1, 1 episode)
- Jennie Jacques as Emily Mullins (Series 3, 1 episode)
- Stephen Campbell Moore as James Delafield (Series 1, 1 episode)
- Hattie Morahan as Miss Enid (Series 3, 1 episode)
- Ronald Pickup as Old Peg Leg (Series 3, 1 episode)
- Robert Pugh as Walter Arless (Series 2, 1 episode; mentioned throughout Series 1)
- Paul Ritter as Mr Steerforth (Series 4, 1 episode)
- Claire Skinner as Mrs Macey (Series 1, 2 episodes)
- Sheridan Smith as Cinderella Doe (Series 2, 1 episode)
- Maggie Steed as Mrs Herring (Series 2, 1 episode)
- Peter Vaughan as Reverend Ellison (Series 1, 2 episodes)
- Danny Webb as Mr Macey (Series 1, 1 episode)

== Filming ==
Interior scenes were shot in a warehouse on Beeches Industrial Estate, in Yate, South Gloucestershire. The villages of Lark Rise and Candleford were both created from scratch on farms in Box and Neston Park, near Corsham in Wiltshire. According to the BBC planning application, Hatt Farm in Box was used because of its proximity to existing cornfields and farm buildings, and Park Farm in Neston Park was chosen for its unspoilt character and attractive traditional buildings.

The outdoor filming at these locations for the first series took 25 days, spread over a 5-month period. The country scenes, including all the comings and goings of the lord of the manor, were shot at Chavenage House north of Tetbury, Gloucestershire.

== Episodes ==
Series	Episodes	Originally released	
Series	Episodes	First released	Last released
1	10	13 January 2008	23 March 2008
2	12	21 December 2008	15 March 2009
3	12	10 January 2010	28 March 2010
4	6	9 January 2011	13 February 2011

=== Series 1 (2008) ===
No. overall	No. in season	Title	Directed by	Written by	Original release date	U.K. viewers (millions)
1	1	"Episode 1"	Charles Palmer	Bill Gallagher	13 January 2008	7.27
Young country girl Laura Timmins leaves her friends and family in the hamlet of Lark Rise to start her first job at the post office in the nearby town of Candleford. Postmistress Dorcas Lane gives Laura a warm welcome, but other residents of Candleford aren't so generous. When Lark Rise residents challenge the post office's 'eight-mile rule' that forces them to pay for delivery of telegrams, Laura finds herself torn between communities. By the quiet intervention of Dorcas, a way is found to include the hamlet within the limit. The episode ends with the inhabitants celebrating their victory.
2	2	"Episode 2"	Charles Palmer	Bill Gallagher	20 January 2008	7.01
Postwoman Mrs Macey receives news that her husband Dan has escaped from prison. Before long the whole town is abuzz with gossip, and Mrs Macey fears that the damage to her reputation will force her to leave Candleford. Meanwhile, her son Freddy has been secretly meeting a mysterious stranger in the woods. The stranger turns out to be Dan, but he is persuaded to turn himself in to local squire and magistrate Sir Timothy Midwinter.
3	3	"Episode 3"	Charles Palmer	Bill Gallagher	27 January 2008	6.66
When local widower Old Amos buys lace gloves for his housekeeper Patty, Dorcas becomes suspicious that she may be after his money. But Laura is distressed when she sees Patty kissing his son Young Amos. Robert refuses to let his children sing a song in praise of the Tories at the Lark Rise church concert, which results in their being banned from the concert altogether. Robert's stubbornness incurs the wrath of his children, family and even the village.
4	4	"Episode 4"	John Greening	Paul Rutman	3 February 2008	6.72
A strange old man arrives in Candleford looking for his estranged daughters — who turn out to be prim shopkeepers Ruby and Pearl Pratt. Horrified to see him out in public, playing scams on the local residents, the sisters must decide whether they can forgive him for deserting them when they needed him most. Meanwhile, Caroline Arless is again being pursued by a bailiff collecting debts.
5	5	"Episode 5"	Charles Palmer	Bill Gallagher	10 February 2008	6.85
Dorcas is thrown by the surprise arrival of a new Post Office inspector, Mr Rushton, who starts to unearth anomalies in the way Dorcas runs the Post Office. He threatens to have Thomas fired for his refusal to collect mail on Sunday. Robert carves a decorative angel on the schoolhouse, extra work for which he is not getting paid.
6	6	"Episode 6"	John Greening	Bill Gallagher	17 February 2008	6.68
Robert takes pity on a homeless family and brings them to stay at his house for the night. In the morning the family have departed, leaving behind their little daughter Polly, who appears to be mute . Lady Adelaide Midwinter meets the girl, falls in love with her, and wants to adopt her; but Sir Timothy thinks that adopting Polly would be inappropriate. He takes Polly to the Post Office where everyone struggles to think of a solution to the problem. Queenie worries about Twister's health, as he believes he is seeing visions of his dead sister.
7	7	"Episode 7"	Marc Jobst	Carolyn Bonnyman	24 February 2008	6.70
The residents rally around Susan Braby when they realise her husband Sam has hit her. But her filing a summons resulting in Sam's arrest causes controversy in Lark Rise. Meanwhile, Sir Timothy commissions Matthew to make new gates for the manor. But Lady Adelaide becomes frustrated with how much time her husband is spending with Dorcas and decides to cancel the order for the gates. Laura brings Phillip White home for tea.
8	8	"Episode 8"	Marc Jobst	Gaby Chiappe	2 March 2008	6.48
A violent storm hits Lark Rise and Candleford, and the arrival of a new teacher, James Delafield, causes divisions in the two communities. Mr Delafield's radical views raise eyebrows in Candleford, while in Lark Rise he endears himself to some residents. When Dorcas delivers some books to Mr Delafield, they initially rub each other up the wrong way; but this tension soon turns to chemistry. Phillip sends Laura a ring and is disappointed when she hesitates to wear it.
9	9	"Episode 9"	John Greening	Bill Gallagher	9 March 2008	6.21
A beautiful embroidered panel that Queenie finds on a grave has the residents of Lark Rise and Candleford intrigued. Twister starts dreaming of everything he could buy if they sold the panel, while Dorcas and Sir Timothy set about getting to the bottom of the mystery of who created it. Caroline Arless returns from debtor's prison, filled with good intentions to avoid future trouble. The rivalry between Alf Arless and Phillip White continues.
10	10	"Episode 10"	John Greening	Bill Gallagher	23 March 2008	6.25
It is Zillah's birthday, and all her friends and locals visit the post office for a party. Tensions mount between Dorcas and Sir Timothy as painful truths about the past begin to surface, and Dorcas decides to sell the post office. Phillip becomes increasingly possessive of Laura, and she expresses doubts about their relationship. Twister's fever and her tea leaf readings have Queenie worried about an upcoming tragedy.

=== Series 2 (2008–2009) ===
No. overall	No. in season	Title	Directed by	Written by	Original release date	U.K. viewers (millions)
11	1	"Episode 1"	Alan Grint	Bill Gallagher	21 December 2008	6.58
Lark Rise and Candleford are transformed as the inhabitants prepare for the Christmas festivities. However, loyalties are tested as the appearance of a ragged, bare-footed young woman leads residents to speak difficult truths amid the gift giving and carol singing. Caroline's husband Walter is back from the sea, but she'd like to prevent him from leaving again. Concerns that Dorcas will be spending her Christmas alone prove unfounded.
12	2	"Episode 2"	Alan Grint	Bill Gallagher	4 January 2009	6.53
Candleford is intrigued by the opening of the Golden Lion Hotel and by the arrival of its owner James Dowland. He grew up in Lark Rise, where Queenie took him in after his mother died. Robert Timmins is suspicious of Dowland's motives and does not approve of his financing renovations to the Turrill's cottage. Meanwhile, Dorcas struggles with her new maid, Minnie. The young woman can do no right; she means well, but she has no experience and no respect for others' possessions, testing Dorcas and those around her.
13	3	"Episode 3"	Alan Grint	Bill Gallagher	11 January 2009	6.13
Dorcas sets out to defeat James in the parish council elections. James belittles her candidacy as a women and says the winner should take the loser to dinner to console them. James proposes to build new houses and give employment to local men. Robert Timmins protests this is to make James a fat profit, but James says he can help the locals and himself. Dorcas gets a bicycle much to Thomas's concern. Twister persuades Alf to try and make Laura jealous by inventing a girl called 'Rose'.
14	4	"Episode 4"	Maurice Phillips	Carolyn Bonnyman	18 April 2009	6.49
The death of the Reverend Ellison, Margaret Ellison's father, unites the communities of Lark Rise and Candleford. But amid the sadness Margaret is confronted by her brother George, whom she blames for her father's death. Overwhelmed with grief, Margaret is oblivious to Thomas Brown's attempt to ask for her hand in marriage. Eventually Thomas becomes the means of effecting a reconciliation between brother and sister, and Margaret enthusiastically agrees to marry him.
15	5	"Episode 5"	Julian Holmes	Bill Gallagher	25 January 2009	6.31
As Emma Timmins feels the strain of all her children, Dorcas (who is her cousin) offers to look after baby Annie for a few days. The presence of the child stirs up difficult feelings for both Dorcas and Ruby Pratt, but Thomas tells Margaret that he does not want children of his own. Fisher Bloom arrives to build the Candleford clock for James Dowland, and Laura develops a contentious relationship with him. When Minnie goes out in the evening with Alf, Fisher and Twister, Laura implies she has loose morals, which Minnie believes means she will have a baby. Dorcas encourages Thomas to tell her about his parents neglect of his siblings, which led him to fear he could not be a good father. But spending time with Annie helps him conquer his fear and tell Margaret he is willing to have children.
16	6	"Episode 6"	Moira Armstrong	Gaby Chiappe	1 February 2009	6.54
When Dorcas is taken ill, the residents of Lark Rise rally to show pride in Laura's new role managing the post office. But Thomas starts sleep-walking, the telegraph machine becomes faulty, and threatening letters begin to arrive for 'the girl at the post office'. Laura thinks this is her, but Minnie fears they are from her brutal stepfather. James pays Minnie to take extra care of Dorcas, and when Dorcas worsens he rides for Queenie, since her herbal remedies worked for him when he was a boy. Dorcas recovers, and when she is told about the nasty letters, she writes a legally threatening letter to Minnie's father. James starts to clarify his feelings for Dorcas.
17	7	"Episode 7"	Sue Tully	Gaby Chiappe	8 February 2009	6.14
Lark Rise and Candleford anticipate the inauguration of the new clock, but when Robert Timmins loses his stonemason's tools, his means to work is lost. Twister comes across a man selling tools on the road, and it appears that all of Robert's tools were sold by the thief. Laura has accepted her attraction to Fisher Bloom, even though he has said he must leave to find work elsewhere when the clock is finished. Now that time is near, she hopes to find a way to keep him in Candleford. The community contributes to restore Robert's tools, and while initially his pride gets in the way, circumstances lead him to accept them.
18	8	"Episode 8"	Alan Grint	Kate Gartside	15 February 2009	6.20
The summer brings a surprise visitor to Candleford in the form of the wealthy Celestia Brice Coulson, who stays at the Golden Lion Hotel. When she learns of the relationship between Dorcas and James, Celestia informs Dorcas that she had a longstanding relationship with James and provided financing for his business. Dorcas is mortified by the revelation, but James denies the personal relationship with Celestia and asks Dorcas to marry him. When Celestia rejects his proposition to be business partners only, James signs his interest in all of their hotels except the Golden Lion back to her and approaches Dorcas as a free but poorer man. in Lark Rise, Emma's father, Old Edmund, arrives for his birthday. But problems arise when Emma asks him to live with them permanently.
19	9	"Episode 9"	David Tucker	Kate Gartside	22 February 2009	6.32
A feud between Lark Rise and the neighbouring village of Fordlow has been simmering for three generations, but young love helps to bring the two communities together and save the day when Queenie's bees go missing. In Candleford, the path of true love runs less smoothly for Thomas and Margaret; will they ever set the date for the wedding? Dorcas needs to clarify her relationship with James.
20	10	"Episode 10"	Patrick Lau	Carolyn Bonnyman	1 March 2009	6.34
Every autumn, Constable Patterson's wife takes to her bed with a mysterious illness. But this year is different, as she gives him permission to seek a new wife after she dies. The constable has no intention of doing any such thing, until Pearl Pratt's brave dispatch of a mouse in the shop sets his heart fluttering. Her sister Ruby does not appreciate his gift of a kitten for the shop and fears that their relationship will lead to scandal. Alf has the opportunity to begin an apprenticeship as a stonemason with Robert, but he wonders if he can be satisfied leaving the land.
21	11	"Episode 11"	Paul Marcus	Gaby Chiappe	8 March 2009	6.78
A sudden storm reveals what appears to be a secret romance and also makes the address on a letter indecipherable. When Dorcas pursues the identity of the letter's recipient, she reveals another secret: a child, kept hidden even from his own father - James Dowland. James is not immediately as supportive as Dorcas would wish, but when she discovers the boy has been placed in an abusive Yorkshire school, he is determined to bring the boy home to Candleford. Thomas is outraged when Margaret chooses Robert to give her away at their wedding.
22	12	"Episode 12"	Moira Armstrong	Bill Gallagher	15 March 2009	6.47
Injured in a riding accident, James Dowland is confined to his hospital bed when his son Sydney arrives in Candleford. Dorcas welcomes the boy into the post office and does everything she can to make him feel at home. James is so determined to be with his son that he leaves the hospital before he has recovered. Sydney wants to stay with Dorcas at the post office, and James reluctantly leaves the boy with her and decides to return to London. He tells the boy they will be able to visit when he is settled. Both Margaret and Thomas are faced with challenges before their wedding day.

=== Series 3 (2010) ===
No. overall	No. in season	Title	Directed by	Written by	Original release date	U.K. viewers (millions)
23	1	"Episode 1"	Sue Tully	Bill Gallagher	10 January 2010	7.49
A young journalist, Daniel Parish, arrives in Lark Rise with exciting news for the Timmins family: Emma is set to inherit a fortune, enough to move the family to a big house in Candleford. Daniel plans to write their rags to riches story for his newspaper, but Dorcas is suspicious of his motives. When the article is published, it sends shockwaves through the community.
24	2	"Episode 2"	David Tucker	Bill Gallagher	17 January 2010	7.07
The Bishop is coming to consecrate the church font, and Thomas cannot contain his excitement. But when a Lark Rise tree starts to 'bleed', the hamlet becomes rife with talk of witchcraft, and Thomas is horrified. Mishaps seem to happen throughout Candleford, and Dorcas makes blunders with terrible consequences for Pearl and Ruby. Twister believes he's received a prophecy of miracles to come. Laura is thrown off balance when Daniel returns to try to win back her affections, but first he has to get around an angry Robert and Emma.
24	3	"Episode 3"	Patrick Lau	Gaby Chiappe	24 January 2010	6.94
Alf throws a party to celebrate moving back into the cottage where he grew up. He entertains his guests with a new song, and its haunting words have a profound effect on all of them. Edmund rebels against his parents' plans for him; Thomas and Margaret have their first marital tiff; and Dorcas's plans to prepare Minnie for marriage and motherhood backfire terribly.
24	4	"Episode 4"	Patrick Lau	Gaby Chiappe	31 January 2010	6.82
It's harvest time — the most important time of the year in Lark Rise, when everyone helps to bring in the wheat that will feed them through winter. So when a measles epidemic hits, it couldn't come at a worse time — with so many sick, how will they gather the wheat and prevent a winter of starvation? For Lark Rise, help comes from an unlikely source. But it is not enough to prevent one family's tragedy.
24	5	"Episode 5"	Moira Armstrong	Bill Gallagher	7 February 2010	6.98
There's a mystery in town as Mr. Reppington takes residence in the Golden Lion but remains firmly isolated from the world, and Dorcas Lane is determined to find out why. Emma Timmins fears that the romance has gone out of her marriage, then worries she might have a secret admirer. Daniel suggests to Dorcas that Reppington is a famous concert pianist and composer who has disappeared. Dorcas meets with the man, but things are not so straightforward. Meanwhile, Ruby Pratt agonizes over whether she should leave Candleford to meet her pen-pal suitor in Pontefract, but cannot face telling her sister Pearl.
24	6	"Episode 6"	Sue Tully	Bill Gallagher	14 February 2010	7.02
Daniel has opened a newspaper in Candleford and is on the lookout for a big story. So when old Peg Leg, a Crimean War veteran, arrives for his annual visit to the Timminses, and Daniel learns he has received no war pension, he starts a newspaper campaign against this injustice. But just as Peg Leg's plight looks set to become a national cause celebre, Emma learns that he is not all he seems, a discovery that threatens to break hearts and destroy Daniel's new venture. Thomas embarks on a course of self-improvement.
24	7	"Episode 7"	Paul Seed	Bill Gallagher	21 February 2010	6.83
The locals are rehearsing for their annual production of St. George and the Dragon when they hear rumours that Sir Timothy has returned. They are thrilled at the prospect of performing it for the squire himself, but with the play fast approaching and no sign of Sir Timothy, Dorcas decides to pay him a visit. She finds only Lady Adelaide. As the two women come face to face they are forced to confront their shared history, learning more about each other than they could have imagined. Twister's insistence on keeping the role of St. George puts the play at risk, and Queenie seeks peace out in the countryside.
24	8	"Episode 8"	David Innes Edwards	Rachel Bennette	28 February 2010	6.88
Pearl is in a state of panic. She has received a dressmaking commission which could save her ailing business, but without Ruby, there is no way she can do the work in time. So when Enid, a talented seamstress, arrives in Candleford looking for a job, it seems Pearl's prayers have been answered. Pearl and Enid form an instant bond, based on mutual admiration and respect. But when Pearl discovers the seamstress is not who she says she is, she is forced to choose between their friendship and her deepest prejudices.
24	9	"Episode 9"	Sue Tully	Bill Gallagher	7 March 2010	6.61
When the Lark Rise school loses its teacher, Emma steps in and discovers a talent she never knew she had. But Margaret also covets the role of schoolteacher, and the two women become rivals for the job. Over in Candleford, Thomas and Dorcas are at odds. After a discouraging trip to Oxford, the postman is agitating for better working conditions, and Dorcas doesn't take it well. Robert is asked to arbitrate between the two.
24	10	"Episode 10"	Patrick Lau	Bill Gallagher	14 March 2010	6.33
When the local Lark Rise gossip Mrs. Mullins discovers her daughter Emily is pregnant, she leaps to the conclusion that Daniel is the father. Everyone, including Laura, rallies round to defend him. But when Daniel's behaviour starts to arouse suspicion and people begin to doubt him, Dorcas is determined to uncover the truth. Twister is outraged when Queenie sells his easy chair so the couple will be able to pay rent through the winter.
24	11	"Episode 11"	Patrick Lau	Bill Gallagher	21 March 2010	6.39
Mischief Night is approaching, and the folks of Lark Rise and Candleford are excitedly planning tricks to play on their neighbours. But Laura is in no mood for silly pranks — Fisher Bloom has returned, intent on winning her back, and it has thrown her feelings for Daniel into turmoil. Fisher also tells Dorcas that the coming of the railway to the nearby town of Inglestone could mean problems for Candleford.
24	12	"Episode 12"	Sue Tully	Bill Gallagher	28 March 2010	6.51
Fisher stays in Candleford longer than planned to renew his pursuit of Laura. When the postmaster at Inglestone, with an old score to settle, tries to force Dorcas into selling up, she is faced with the heartbreaking prospect of losing her home and denying Sydney his dream of running the post office one day. Thomas and Margaret welcome a little friend into their home.

=== Series 4 (2011) ===
No. overall	No. in season	Title	Directed by	Written by	Original release date	U.K. viewers (millions)
35	1	"Episode 1"	Sue Tully	Bill Gallagher	9 January 2011	7.68
Gabriel Cochrane, the once-wealthy owner of a large iron foundry, arrives in Candleford. The bank has repossessed his home and business, his young wife has died, and Gabriel finds himself looking for a new start. The people of Candleford take him to their hearts, and Dorcas offers him a job at the forge and a home. But will their kindness be enough to save him, or will he let his vendetta against the bank and his grief over his dead wife prevent him rebuilding his fortunes and finding happiness again?
36	2	"Episode 2"	Sue Tully	Bill Gallagher	16 January 2011	7.31
When Daniel announces that his newspaper is launching a poetry competition, it sends the inhabitants of Candleford into a frenzy of creative excitement. Laura has high hopes of taking home the trophy and begins writing feverishly; Pearl indulges in plagiarism after her own efforts are found wanting; and even Margaret embarks upon an epic poem based on her husband’s postal rounds. A letter written by Gabriel's dead wife found in a book from his former home presents Dorcas with a dilemma.
37	3	"Episode 3"	Sue Tully	Bill Gallagher	23 January 2011	7.02
Thomas is euphoric when he lands the job of organising the church bazaar. But his joy soon evaporates when the vicar falls ill, and the controversial and free-thinking curate Reverend Marley takes charge. Thomas is convinced that Marley is evil incarnate, and when he comes across a huge snake on his postal rounds, he sees it as a sign that the devil is indeed amongst them. The animal's appearance in Lark Rise disturbs Emma, whose husband Robert has been working in Oxford for months.
38	4	"Episode 4"	Patrick Lau	Rachel Bennette	30 January 2011	6.90
The Fair has come to town, and the locals are celebrating - Alf has been crowned Champion of the Fair, and Laura the Queen. Queenie has won a whole Berkshire pig, and the Lark Risers start fattening it up in preparation for a sumptuous pig feast. But Twister cannot resist the temptation of selling portions of the animal to the people of Candleford. At the post office, Gabriel moves into the attic and is proving to be a less than perfect house guest. Can he and Dorcas adapt to living under the same roof? And will Twister survive the wrath of Queenie when she discovers he has sold her pig from under her?
39	5	"Episode 5"	Sue Tully	Bill Gallagher	6 February 2011	6.96
Daniel is planning a cricket match against a neighbouring village team, who he is convinced cheated in their last match. He is determined to restore Candleford's honour, but most of Daniel's regular players are away, and the men of Lark Rise are cricketing novices. A humiliating defeat looks certain, until Daniel discovers that the finest batsman in the county is right under his nose. The only problem is, his batsman is a batswoman, and the rules state women cannot play.
40	6	"Episode 6"	Sue Tully	Bill Gallagher	13 February 2011	7.01
Gabriel has finally completed the machine which he hopes will restore his fortunes, and farmers are soon clamouring to buy his ingenious invention. Dorcas is delighted for him, until she realises it could mean his departure from Candleford. Meanwhile, Caroline has returned to Lark Rise, and Minnie assumes it's only a matter of time before Alf proposes, now that his ma is back to look after her children. But will Caroline settle this time and allow Alf his freedom? And how will Gabriel react to a surprising admission from Dorcas?

== Cancellation ==
It was announced on 22 January 2011 that the show would not be returning for a fifth series. The decision caused viewer complaints, prompting BBC One controller Danny Cohen to say, "Lark Rise to Candleford has been a truly wonderful part of the BBC One schedule and we are incredibly grateful to writer Bill Gallagher and the team. But we feel the time is right to make room for new dramas which we hope will be taken to the nation's hearts in the same way."

Following that announcement, many viewers took to setting up and signing online campaigns to see the show recommissioned. In response, Ben Stephenson of the BBC finally announced the decision was based on the departure of writer and executive producer Bill Gallagher, whose "creative energy" was considered essential to the series.
