= Allan Cubitt =

British writer, director, and producer

- Born: 17 August 1954 (age 71); Croydon, Surrey, England
- Occupations: Writer, director, producer
- Years active: 1988 – present
- Known for: Prime Suspect II; The Fall

Allan Cubitt is a British television, film, and theatre writer, director, and producer and former teacher, best known for his work on Prime Suspect II and The Fall.

== Career ==
In 1988, Cubitt got his start as a playwright where his play, Winter Darkness, won a Thames Television bursary award that funded a year long writer-in-residence program at the Guildhall School of Music and Drama. During that year, Cubitt wrote and directed The Pool of Bethesda in a production that starred the then Guildhall students Fay Ripley, Naveen Andrews and Peter Wingfield. That production of The Pool of Bethesda won the Thames Television Best New Play and Best Production Awards. It was subsequently restaged at the Orange Tree Theatre with a different cast. This led to scriptwriting work at the BBC.

Cubitt's first TV script was 1990's The Land of Dreams, and was the story of an asylum-seeking Black South African struggling with his new life in the UK. The TV show featured the actor Antony Sher and was part of the long-running anthology Screenplay TV series on BBC Two. In 1992, Cubitt wrote the script for The Countess Alice, a made-for-TV film starring Wendy Hiller and Zoë Wanamaker about the Berlin Wall coming down. The story was co-produced with WGBH-TV and was also part of Screenplay.

Cubitt's first high-profile work as a writer was for the Helen Mirren mini-series, Prime Suspect II, which premiered in 1992. It was BAFTA nominated and won a Primetime Emmy Award.

1995's The Hanging Gale was a BAFTA nominated mini-series about the Great Famine in Ireland.

In 1997, Cubitt again worked with Helen Mirren on the mini-series, Painted Lady. He wrote the part for Mirren.

Also in 1997, Cubitt wrote the film St. Ives, known as All for Love in the United Kingdom, a romance featuring Miranda Richardson that was based on an unfinished work by Robert Louis Stevenson.

In 2000, Cubitt wrote the script adaption for the Anna Karenina mini-series which starred Helen McCrory and was made for Channel 4. It later aired on Masterpiece Theatre in the United States.

In 2002 and 2004, Cubitt worked on two separate Sherlock Holmes projects, an adaptation of The Hound of the Baskervilles, a film project that starred Richard Roxburgh, and an original story called The Case of the Silk Stockings, which starred Rupert Everett.

In 2009, Cubitt adapted the Simon Carr memoir, The Boys Are Back in Town, into the Australian film, The Boys Are Back, that starred Clive Owen and was directed by Scott Hicks.

Cubitt created the 2013 BBC Two television series, The Fall, from an initial pitch in 2009. The initial pitch was for twelve episodes, which ended up being split over the first two series. The show, which Cubitt characterises as a psychological drama, stars Gillian Anderson and Jamie Dornan. Cubitt wrote and produced the first series, then wrote, produced and directed series two and three. Northern Ireland and Belfast are both a setting, a character, and an integral part of the show, and Cubitt wrote the majority of the show while based there, and cast the majority of the actors from there.

In 2018 Cubitt wrote and directed an adaptation of Eugene McCabe's 1993 novel, Death & Nightingales starring Matthew Rhys, Ann Skelly and Jamie Dornan.

Cubitt is also a composer. He wrote a number of songs for 1997's Painted Lady, starring Helen Mirren. More recently, Cubitt contributed music throughout the three series of The Fall. He wrote Katie's songs and played guitar as she sings. Cubitt contributed two pieces of jazz music to the second series of The Fall, specifically episode 3, which was arranged and played by jazz pianist John Donaldson. He also wrote the music and played guitar and harmonica and sang "Spector's Blues," the song that played at the beginning of the second series of The Fall, episode 5 and again during Spector's dream in the car in episode 1 of season three.

As of October 2016, Cubitt is working on a new British TV series as well as a play at National Theatre in London.

== Filmography ==
- 1990: The Land of Dreams (Telefilm in the Screenplay strand) – Writer
- 1992: The Countess Alice (Telefilm in the Screenplay strand) – Writer
- 1992: Prime Suspect II (Series) – Writer
- 1995: The Hanging Gale (Miniseries) – Writer
- 1997: Painted Lady (Miniseries) – Writer
- 1998: St. Ives aka All for Love (Telefilm) – Writer
- 2000: Anna Karenina (Miniseries) – Screenplay, Executive Producer
- 2002: Evolution (Documentary) – Writer (1 episode: "Darwin's Dangerous Idea" on disk 1)
- 2002: The Hound of the Baskervilles (Telefilm) – Screenplay, Co-Executive Producer
- 2004: Sherlock Holmes and the Case of the Silk Stocking (Telefilm) – Writer, Co-Executive Producer
- 2005-06: Murphy's Law (Series) – Writer
- 2009: The Boys Are Back (Feature film) – Writer
- 2011: The Runaway (Series) – Writer
- 2013-16: The Fall (Series) – Writer, Director, Creator, Executive Producer
- 2018: Death and Nightingales (Series) - Writer, Director, Executive Producer

Theatre

- 1988: Winter Darkness at New End Theatre, Hampstead – Writer
- 1990: The Pool of Bethesda at Orange Tree Theatre, Richmond – Writer and Director

== Awards ==
- 1990: Pearson Playwrights' Scheme (f/k/a Thames Television Theatre Writers Scheme), Best New Play and Best Production Awards for The Pool of Bethesda
- 1992: The Writers' Guild of Great Britain The Pool of Bethesda Nominated Best Fringe Theatre Play
- 1992: 28th Golden Prague Awards, Intervision and Eurovision Award for The Land of Dreams
- 1993: BAFTA British Academy Television Awards, nominated for TV Drama Serial for Prime Suspect II
- 1993: Emmy Award, Outstanding Mini-Series for Prime Suspect II
- 1993: Peabody Award for Prime Suspect II
- 1994: Edgar Allan Poe Award, Best TV Mystery Feature or Mini Series for Prime Suspect II
- 1995: The Writers' Guild of Great Britain for The Hanging Gale nominated Best Original Drama Serial.
- 1996: BAFTA British Academy Television Awards, nominated for TV Drama Serial for The Hanging Gale
- 2010: AFI Award for The Boys Are Back (film) nominated for best adapted screenplay.
- 2014: BAFTA British Academy Television Awards, nominated for Television Mini Series for The Fall
- 2014: Edgar Allan Poe Award, Best Television Episode Teleplay for The Fall − "Episode 1"
- 2014: Irish Film & Television Academy | IFTA Best Drama for The Fall
- 2015: London Screenwriters' Festival, Best British Crime Writing for The Fall
- 2020: Irish Film & Television Academy | IFTA Best Drama for Death and Nightingales

== Works and publications ==
- Cubitt, Allan (1988). Winter Darkness.
- Cubitt, Allan (1992). The Pool of Bethesda. London: Warner Chappell Plays. ISBN 978-0-85-676156-0. OCLC 26719785. OL 24754004M.
