= Moira Armstrong =

Scottish television director (born 1930)

- Born: 1930 (age 95–96); Crieff, Scotland
- Occupation: television director

Moira Armstrong (born 1930) is a Scottish television director.

Born in Crieff and raised in north-east Scotland, Armstrong initially worked in BBC Radio where she trained as a continuity announcer before switching to television.

Her credits include episodes of Armchair Thriller (based on the novel Quiet as a Nun), The Borderers (1969), The Onedin Line, Lark Rise to Candleford, Where the Heart Is, The Bill, Midsomer Murders, Something in Disguise, The Wednesday Play, and Adam Adamant Lives!, the biographical serial Freud (1984) as well as the television film The Countess Alice (1992).

She also directed Sunset Song, the 1971 adaptation for television of Lewis Grassic Gibbon's novel, notable not only for being the first drama to be recorded in colour by BBC Scotland but also featuring its first nude scene.

Armstrong (with Jonathan Powell) won the 1980 BAFTA Best Drama Series/Serial award for Testament of Youth (1979).

== Other credits ==
- Shoulder to Shoulder (and Waris Hussein, 1974)

== See also ==
- List of female film and television directors
- List of LGBT-related films directed by women
