= Paul Marcus =

British television director and producer

- Born: Paul Coryn Valentine Marcus; 30 May 1954; London, England
- Died: 13 February 2011 (aged 56); London, England
- Occupation: Television director
- Spouse: Viviana Maranzano (1987–2011)

Paul Coryn Valentine Marcus (30 May 1954 – 13 February 2011) was a BAFTA winning British television director and producer. His most notable success was as producer of the television series Prime Suspect, but he also worked in cinema, theatre and many other TV series.

== Early life ==
Marcus was born in London in 1954, the son of playwright Frank Marcus, a German-born Jew who fled to Britain in 1939 and the actress Jacqueline Sylvester. He was educated at Latymer Upper School and Lincoln College, Oxford.

== Credits ==
His credits include the following:

- New Voices (1994, TV series)
- Prime Suspect: The Scent of Darkness (1995, TV movie)
- Wokenwell (1997, TV series)
- Break Up (1998)
- Plastic Man (1999, TV series)
- After Alice (2000)
- Murder Rooms: Mysteries of the Real Sherlock Holmes (2001, TV series)
- The Bill (2002, TV series)
- In Deep (2001 –2003, TV series)
- Imperium: Nerone (2004, TV movie)
- Heidi (2005)
- Dalziel and Pascoe (2000–2006, TV series)
- Roman Mysteries (2007, TV series)
- Lark Rise To Candleford (2009, TV series)
