= Steven Brown (cricketer) =

Zimbabwean cricketer (born 1979)

Personal information
- Full name: Steven Paul Brown
- Born: 15 January 1979 (age 47); Bulawayo, Rhodesia
- Batting: Right-handed
- Bowling: Right-arm off break
- Role: Bowler

Domestic team information
- Years: Team
- 1999/2000: Matabeleland

Career statistics
Competition	FC
Matches	3
Runs scored	13
Batting average	3.25
100s/50s	0/0
Top score	10
Balls bowled	426
Wickets	6
Bowling average	41.50
5 wickets in innings	0
10 wickets in match	0
Best bowling	2/1
Catches/stumpings	1/–
- Source: ESPNcricinfo, 16 July 2021

Steven Paul Brown (born 15 January 1979) is a former Zimbabwean cricketer. A right-arm off break bowler, he played three first-class matches for Matabeleland during the 1999–2000 Logan Cup.
