= List of Prime Suspect (British TV series) episodes =

The following is a list of episodes of the British police procedural television drama series Prime Suspect, which stars Helen Mirren as Jane Tennison. As one of the first female detective chief inspectors in Greater London's Metropolitan Police Service, she eventually rises to rank of detective superintendent while confronting the institutionalised sexism that exists within the police force.

== Series overview ==
Series	Episodes	Originally released		Avg. UK viewers (millions)
Series	Episodes	First released	Last released	Avg. UK viewers (millions)
1	2	7 April 1991	8 April 1991	14.02
2	2	15 December 1992	16 December 1992	14.35
3	2	19 December 1993	20 December 1993	14.15
4	3	30 April 1995	15 May 1995	12.73
5	2	20 October 1996	21 October 1996	14.52
6	2	9 November 2003	10 November 2003	10.19
7	2	15 October 2006	22 October 2006	8.21

== Episodes ==
=== Series 1 (1991) ===
No. overall	No. in series	Title	Directed by	Written by	Original release date	UK viewers (millions)
1	1	"Price to Pay: Part 1"	Christopher Menaul	Lynda La Plante	7 April 1991	13.93
Jane Tennison is a detective chief inspector assigned to Southampton Row Police Station in Central London. She is repeatedly passed over for major cases, but following the death of a senior investigating officer, DCI Shefford, she is grudgingly given the opportunity to take over his latest homicide investigation. The crime involves the brutal murder of a young woman whose body has been badly mutilated, and her hands have been tied behind her back. Forensic evidence points to one George Marlow as the prime suspect. However, Tennison struggles to connect him directly to the crime scene: a prostitute's bedsit. A second murder victim is discovered with similar injuries. The episode ends on a cliffhanger as a witness tries to identify Marlow in an identity parade.
2	2	"Price to Pay: Part 2"	Christoper Menaul	Lynda La Plante	8 April 1991	14.11
Marlow is not identified in the lineup and goes free. As several more murder cases are connected to the first two victims, the investigation becomes a hunt for a serial killer. All the victims are of different ages, backgrounds and appearances, which hampers progress. Tennison's personal life suffers as she tries to solve the case and win the respect of her male colleagues. Marlow's common-law wife, Moyra Henson, works as a manicurist; the police realize Marlow's victims were also her clients. Marlow is arrested when he retrieves his car, which is discovered hidden in the garage where he brutally carried out the murders. Tennison and the team celebrate after she obtains a confession. Despite the confession, Marlow pleads not guilty at his trial.

=== Series 2 (1992) ===
No. overall	No. in series	Title	Directed by	Written by	Original release date	UK viewers (millions)
3	1	"Operation Nadine: Part 1"	John Strickland	Allan Cubitt	15 December 1992	14.27
The skeletal remains of a teenage girl are found in the backyard of a house in a predominantly Afro-Caribbean neighborhood of London. Tennison is assigned to the case, code-named "Operation Nadine". She must tread carefully, due to racial tensions surrounding unsolved crimes in the area. The investigation commissions a clay reconstruction of the victim's face in an attempt to discover her identity. Tennison is caught off guard when DS Bob Oswald (with whom she recently had a short-lived romance) is tokenly assigned to the case. The victim is identified as Joanne Fagunwa, a runaway and performer. Tennison investigates the former tenant of the building, David Harvey. Oswald focuses on Tony Allen, the son of the building's former owners. The episode ends as Oswald arrests Allen, while Tennison attempts to coax a deathbed confession out of the gravely ill Harvey.
4	2	"Operation Nadine: Part 2"	John Strickland	Allan Cubitt	16 December 1992	14.43
The team receives a confession from Harvey. Unfortunately, inconsistencies between his story and the evidence cause Tennison to believe the murderer is still at large. While in police custody, Tony hangs himself in his cell, leading to an inquiry. The case is further jeopardized when Tennison and Oswald's relationship is disclosed in the media by Harvey's nephew, Jason Reynolds. Tennison connects Reynolds to the murder of Joanne via old photos and a unique belt buckle. Tony's sister, Sarah, reveals that she and Tony witnessed Joanne's rape and murder at the hands of Reynolds. Oswald finds Reynolds's pornography lab and successfully arrests him. D. Supt. Kernan is promoted and Tennison is upset she wasn't interviewed to take his place. She requests a transfer and leaves for a new station.

=== Series 3 (1993) ===
No. overall	No. in series	Title	Directed by	Written by	Original release date	UK viewers (millions)
5	1	"Keeper of Souls: Part 1"	David Drury	Lynda La Plante	19 December 1993	14.27
Tennison briefly reunites with an old flame, an author, but breaks it off, as he is married with children. She accepts a new job as DCI in Metro Vice, reuniting with the difficult DS Otley, after the former DCI was scapegoated after a failed operation. An apartment fire is determined to be deliberately set, and the death of the victim, a 17-year-old rent boy, Colin 'Connie' Jenkins, is ruled to be a murder. The Detective Superintendent unambiguously informs Tennison that her number one priority is clearing the streets of rent boys and other youthful offenders. She sees a connection between that and the Jenkins murder. Every officer with rank, including Tennison's former boss, warns her to quit her murder enquiries. The investigation leads to a centre for homeless boys, run by Edward Parker-Jones. The operation's prime suspect is James Jackson, a violent and ruthless procurer of children for prostitution.
6	2	"Keeper of Souls: Part 2"	David Drury	Lynda La Plante	20 December 1993	14.03
Tennison and her team gather more information about the possible paedophile ring. DI Ray Hebdon reveals he is gay and can help the investigation with his knowledge of local gay clubs. Tennison and DI Brian Dalton then interview young men who were sexually abused by Parker-Jones. Dalton reveals he was instructed to report to his superiors if retired Asst. Deputy Commissioner Kennington's name came up. A case of mistaken identity causes Jackson to attack a detective in drag, leading to his arrest. Tennison learns Jenkins was murdered for attempting to sell evidence of his story to a reporter, Jessica Smithy. Kennington is linked to the paedophile ring and dies by suicide but Parker-Jones walks free due to lack of an eyewitness. Tennison allows Smithy access to Jenkins' file, in hopes she will expose the story.

=== Series 4 (1995) ===
No. overall	No. in series	Title	Directed by	Written by	Original release date	UK viewers (millions)
7	1	"The Lost Child"	John Madden	Paul Billing	30 April 1995	12.95
A child's death points to a convicted child molester, who has completed his prison sentence and now lives with a woman and her two young daughters, having kept his past a secret from them. However, the man's counsellor believes that he would not have committed the crime because of his preference in victims. The police hound and assault the man and, in desperation, he kidnaps his girlfriend to prove his innocence. Meanwhile, Tennison is promoted to Detective Superintendent.
8	2	"Inner Circles"	Sarah Pia Anderson	Eric Deacon & Meredith Oakes	7 May 1995	13.24
Tennison, on loan to another jurisdiction, is sent in to investigate a murder of a country club manager. At first glance, it looks like a fairly obvious sex death, but the facts suggest otherwise. As Tennison investigates, she uncovers a link to ongoing situations within the local municipal government, and uncovers a possible land purchase political scandal which proves to be much larger and darker than she anticipated.
9	3	"The Scent of Darkness"	Paul Marcus	Guy Hibbert	15 May 1995	12.00
A series of murders resembling those by George Marlow, who was investigated in series 1, has encouraged Tennison's subordinates to reopen the case, given that Marlow was still in prison when the new crimes took place. Tennison objects, as she is sure Marlow is guilty, and suspects a copycat, but is overruled by her superiors and removed from the case. She is vindicated after suspicion eventually falls onto a warder who became controlled by Marlow in prison.

=== Series 5 (1996) ===
No. overall	No. in series	Title	Directed by	Written by	Original release date	UK viewers (millions)
10	1	"Errors of Judgement: Part 1"	Philip Davis	Guy Andrews	20 October 1996	14.72
Following the end of "The Scent of Darkness", Tennison is transferred to Manchester CID, where she investigates the murder of a drug dealer that she believes was committed by a local gang leader and folk hero known as "The Street".
11	2	"Errors of Judgement: Part 2"	Philip Davis	Guy Andrews	21 October 1996	14.32
The case becomes even more sinister when another murder is committed, but Tennison finds it difficult to prove that "The Street" was responsible for the attack, as he manages to keep one step ahead of the investigation – leading her to suspect she may have a mole in her team. The case comes to a head when it is revealed that Tennison's superior is feeding "The Street" intelligence in order to reduce overall crime rates.

=== Series 6 (2003) ===
No. overall	No. in series	Title	Directed by	Written by	Original release date	UK viewers (millions)
12	1	"The Last Witness: Part 1"	Tom Hooper	Peter Berry	9 November 2003	10.50
As her career path stagnates, Tennison, now 54, feels pressured to consider her future. She copes with "modern" policing, including her current supervisor who was once junior to her. While dealing with 24 murder cases simultaneously, she decides to personally assume leadership into the investigation into the cruel murder of a Bosnian Muslim refugee. As the team uncovers evidence of the victims and perpetrators of past crimes in the Yugoslav Wars, the prime suspect is a security guard of Serbian heritage. She is also reunited with a photojournalist who documented the war and with whom she was once involved.
13	2	"The Last Witness: Part 2"	Tom Hooper	Peter Berry	10 November 2003	9.88
Tennison grieves over the death of the victim's sister, and blames herself for not saving her in time. Although the prime suspect confesses to the deaths, Tennison believes he is not the sole culprit. After meeting with her father (who had seen the camps in Nazi Germany), she and the photojournalist visit Bosnia, against orders, to learn more about the optometrist who interprets for the suspect. Returning, she is cautioned and told to halt her inquiries under the Official Secrets Act. Soldiering onwards, Tennison is suspended but continues seeking evidence of the translator's fake identity and crimes.

=== Series 7 (2006) ===
No. overall	No. in series	Title	Directed by	Written by	Original release date	UK viewers (millions)
14	1	"The Final Act: Part 1"	Philip Martin	Frank Deasy	15 October 2006	7.90
While dealing with her increasing alcoholism, Tennison leads her team in solving one last case before her imminent retirement from the force as a detective superintendent – the disappearance of Tony and Ruth Sturdy's 14-year-old daughter, Sallie. Meanwhile, as her widowed father nears death, she is reunited with her only other sibling, her sister, and, as he dies, Tennison begins to become emotionally overwhelmed. The investigation begins uncovering the teenager's private life, and her unexplained disappearance soon becomes a murder. Tensions rise when the daughter's pregnancy is revealed at autopsy and investigators seek to uncover the father.
15	2	"The Final Act: Part 2"	Philip Martin	Frank Deasy	22 October 2006	8.51
A former comrade of Tennison's, who she runs into at an AA meeting, dies after being shot by one of the suspects who then flees with the help of another. Soon, both high-school boys are arrested and DNA tested for paternity. After being cleared, attention also turns to another suspect, the high-school principal. After her father's funeral, Tennison's personal issues overwhelm her, leading to a tense run-in with her sister and niece. The principal later admits to a sexual relationship and is arrested. The investigation darkens when the principal's daughter is found to have had the dead girl's necklace and admits to stabbing her friend.
