= Stephen Brown House =

Stephen Brown House may refer to the following buildings on the United States National Register of Historic Places:

- Stephen Cooke Brown House, a historic house near Springfield, Washington County, Kentucky
- Stephen William Brown Stone House, a historic house near Montpelier, Stutsman County, North Dakota
