= Stephen Brown-Fried =

American theater director

- Born: Stephen Fried
- Occupation: Theater director Associate Director of Gingold Theatrical Group

Stephen Brown-Fried is an American theater director. He is primarily known for his work on New York and regional stages. He currently serves as the chair of the New School of Drama's Directing program. Additionally, he is a lecturer at the Yale School of Drama. He is the Associate Director at the Off-Broadway Non-Profit Gingold Theatrical Group.

== Background ==
Brown-Fried was born Stephen Ernest Fried to Wendy Fried and Peter Fried. Brown-Fried graduated from Stanford University and went on to earn an MFA in directing from The Yale School of Drama.

== Stage work ==
Brown-Fried has directed in regional theatres and New York's Off-Broadway Theatres. With the Public Theater and the National Asian American Theatre Company, Brown-Fried directed a production of Awake and Sing!, which received widespread critical acclaim and was nominated for a Drama League Award for Best Revival.

With the Trinity Shakespeare Festival, Brown Fried has directed multiple pieces, including A Midsummer Night's Dream which broke box office records for the festival. Brown-Fried's other work with the Trinity Shakespeare Festival includes Much Ado About Nothing, Macbeth, Julius Caesar, and The Merchant of Venice, which was named one of the top Regional Theatre productions by D Magazine, Theater Jones, Fort Worth Star-Telegram and Criticalrant.com.

With Northern Stage, he directed Shakespeare's Macbeth.

At Shakespeare Theatre of New Jersey, he directed Misalliance, All’s Well That Ends Well, and The Comedy of Errors. There, he served as their Artistic Associate.

Brown-Fried is currently the Associate Director at the Off-Broadway Non-Profit, Gingold Theatrical Group. Here, he oversees the two New Work Development Programs, Press Cuttings and Speakers' Corner, along with Gingold Theatrical Group Artistic Director David Staller.

He received the Drama League Director's Fellowship and the Jacob Javitz Fellowship.

== Educating ==
As an educator, Brown-Fried currently serves as the head of the New School's Directing Program, in New York City.

Additionally, he is a lecturer for the Yale School of Drama.

At New York University's Tisch School for the Arts, he was a guest director.
