= Steven Brown (politician) =

American politician

Member-elect of the New Hampshire House of Representatives from the Carroll 5th district
- Assuming office December 2026
- Succeeding: Jonathan Smith

Personal details
- Party: Republican

Steven Brown is an American politician. A member of the Republican Party, he is the member-elect for the Carroll 5th district of the New Hampshire House of Representatives.
