= Stephen G. R. Brown =

British materials scientist

Stephen G. R. Brown FICME FIMMM FLSW is a materials scientist and head of the Materials Research Centre at Swansea University.

Brown is a specialist in computational materials whose work has centred on writing code in finite element, finite difference, cellular automata, Monte Carlo method and data analysis techniques. He has had research collaborations with industry including relationships with Rolls-Royce and Airbus. In 2010 he took over the role as the head of the Materials Research Centre, which was previously held buy Professor Valerie Randle.

He is currently the Director of Eidawn Software Ltd., in Swansea.

Brown's main research areas are in solidification, heat transfer, computational fluid dynamics, microstructure evolution, and granular flow.

In 2017, Brown was elected a Fellow of the Learned Society of Wales.

== Selected research papers ==
- Numerical Determination of Liquid Flow Permeabilities for Equiaxed Dendritic Structures, SGR Brown, JA Spittle, RS Walden-Bevan and DJ Jarvis, Acta Materialia, 50 (2002), 1559-1569.
- An Analysis of Kinetic Monte Carlo Simulation as a tool for Modelling Strain Ageing, A.J.P.Gater & S.G.R Brown, Scripta Materialia 53 (2005) 625–630.
- 3D Computer simulation of the influence of microstructure on the cut edge corrosion behaviour of a zinc aluminium alloy galvanized steels SGR Brown & NC Barnard, Corrosion Science 48 (2006) 2291–2303
- A review of measurement techniques for the thermal expansion coefficient of metals and alloys at elevated temperatures, JD James, JA Spittle, SGR Brown & RW Evans Meas. Sci. & Tech., 12(2001), R1-R15.
