= Zoë Wanamaker =

American-born British actress (born 1949)

Zoë Wanamaker CBE
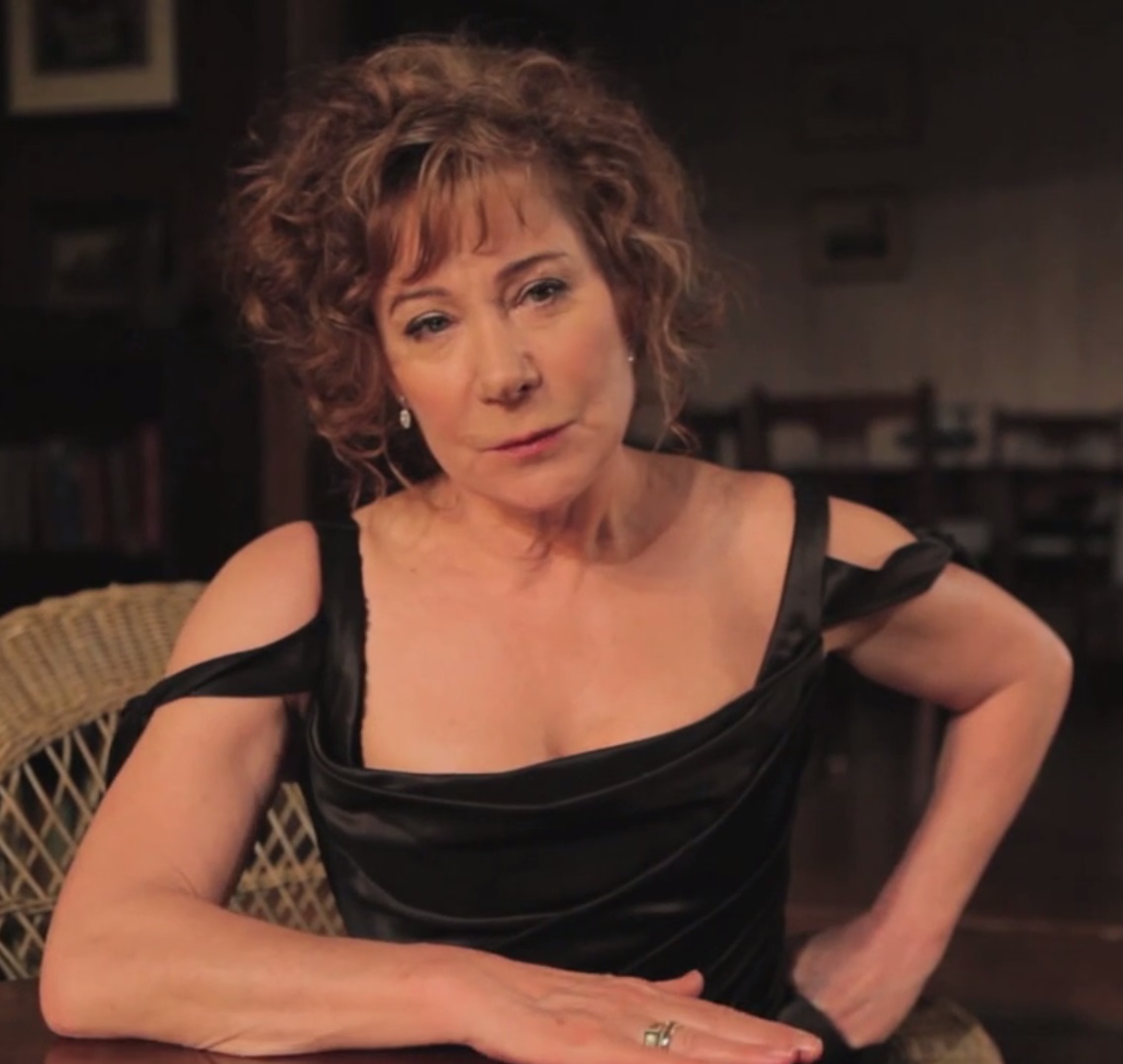
- Wanamaker in 2013
- Born: 13 May 1949 (age 77); New York City, U.S.
- Citizenship: United States; United Kingdom
- Education: Royal Central School of Speech and Drama
- Occupation: Actress
- Years active: 1970–present
- Spouse: Gawn Grainger (m. 1994; died 2025)
- Father: Sam Wanamaker
- Relatives: Marc Wanamaker (cousin)
- Zoë Wanamaker's voice from the BBC programme Front Row; Recorded 2 May 2013
- Website: zoewanamaker.com

Zoë Wanamaker (born 13 May 1949) is an American-born British actress who has worked extensively with the Royal Shakespeare Company and the National Theatre. Wanamaker was appointed a Commander of the Order of the British Empire in 2001 by Queen Elizabeth II. She has received numerous accolades including a Laurence Olivier Award and nominations for three BAFTA Awards, and four Tony Awards.

A nine-time Olivier Award nominee, she won for Once in a Lifetime (1979) and Electra (1998). She has also received four Tony Award nominations for her work on Broadway; for Piaf (1981), Loot (1986), Electra (1999), and Awake and Sing! (2006).

She has acted in the films Wilde (1997), Harry Potter and the Philosopher's Stone (2001), and My Week with Marilyn (2011). She was twice nominated for the BAFTA TV Award for Best Actress, for Prime Suspect (1991) and Love Hurts (1992–1994). She portrayed Susan Harper in the sitcom My Family (2000–2011), and appeared in the ITV dramas Agatha Christie's Poirot (2005–2013), Mr Selfridge (2015), and Girlfriends (2018).

== Early life ==
Zoë Wanamaker was born in New York City on 13 May 1949, the daughter of Canadian actress and radio performer Charlotte Holland and American actor, film director, and radio producer Sam Wanamaker (born Samuel Wattenmacker). Her father was of Ukrainian-Jewish descent, although she had a secular and non-observant upbringing. The BBC series Who Do You Think You Are?, broadcast on 24 February 2009, revealed that her paternal grandfather Maurice Wanamaker (originally Manus Watmacher) was a tailor from Mykolaiv.

Whilst working in the United Kingdom in 1952, Wanamaker's father found out he had been blacklisted in Hollywood. Her parents therefore decided to remain in the UK. She was educated at the independent King Alfred School in Hampstead and at Sidcot School, a Quaker boarding school in Winscombe, Somerset. Zoe attended Hornsey College of Art for the Pre-Diploma Course before going on to study acting at the Central School of Speech and Drama.

== Career ==
=== Stage ===
Wanamaker's career started in the theatre. From 1976 to 1984 she was a member of the Royal Shakespeare Company. She won an Olivier Award for her 1979 performance in Once in a Lifetime and a second for Sophocles' Electra in 1998. In 1985, she played Verdi's wife Giuseppina Strepponi in the original production of After Aida. She appeared on stage playing the part of Beatrice opposite Simon Russell Beale as Benedick in the National Theatre's production of Much Ado About Nothing. She has received Tony Award nominations for her performances in Piaf, Loot, Electra, and Awake and Sing!.

In 1997, Wanamaker was the first person to speak on the stage of the newly completed replica theatre, Shakespeare's Globe, on London's South Bank. This was in recognition of the role played by her father in founding the new theatre. She subsequently became Honorary President of the Globe.

From May to October 2010, Wanamaker appeared in Arthur Miller's All My Sons as Kate Keller at the Apollo Theatre on Shaftesbury Avenue in London.

Wanamaker appeared in Terence Rattigan's All On Her Own from 24 October 2015 until 13 January 2016 at the Garrick Theatre. The work is a one-woman play that preceded Rattigan's Harlequinade, which she also appeared in, each night as part of a never-before-seen double bill. In 2016 she appeared in the world premiere production of Elegy at the Donmar Warehouse.

She returned to the Broadway stage in the 2023 Sharr White memory play Pictures From Home alongside Nathan Lane and Danny Burstein. The play is adapted from photographer Larry Sultan's photo memoir of the same name.

=== Screen ===
Starting in the early 1980s, Wanamaker began performing on screen, most notably in a number of critically acclaimed television productions, such as the BBC Television production Edge of Darkness; she was nominated for a BAFTA Award for her portrayal of the love interest of a suspected serial killer in the first instalment of the Granada series Prime Suspect.

Television series have included Paradise Postponed (as Charlotte Fanner-Titmuuss, 1986) and Love Hurts (1992–94) with Adam Faith. She appeared with Wendy Hiller in The Countess Alice in 1992, playing a rebellious woman searching for the truth about her past in war-torn Germany. She played Clarice, one of the dim-witted twin sisters of Lord Groan in Gormenghast (2000), a BBC television adaptation of Mervyn Peake's trilogy. She played Madam Hooch in the film Harry Potter and the Philosopher's Stone (2001). She did not reprise the role in the rest of the sequels, accusing the producers of underpaying their actors.

Wanamaker portrayed Susan Harper in the BBC situation comedy My Family from 2000 to 2011. She voiced a CGI character named Lady Cassandra in the Doctor Who episode "The End of the World" (2005), and reprised the role (also appearing in the flesh this time) in the episode "New Earth" (2006). Wanamaker lent her voice to the 2008 Xbox 360 game Fable II as the blind Seeress Theresa, who guides the playing character throughout the game. She returned to voice Theresa again in Fable III in 2010, and again in 2012 for Fable: The Journey.

She played Ariadne Oliver in six episodes of Agatha Christie's Poirot. In 2011, she played Paula Strasberg in Simon Curtis' My Week with Marilyn, which depicts the making of the 1957 film The Prince and the Showgirl starring Marilyn Monroe and Laurence Olivier. In 2015, she joined the cast of Mr. Selfridge as Princess Marie, the Russian mother-in-law of Rosalie Selfridge/Bolotoff. In 2021, she played Baghra, Alina Starkov's strict teacher and knowing adviser in Shadow and Bone.

== Honours ==
Wanamaker was appointed a Commander of the Order of the British Empire in the 2001 New Year Honours for services to drama. She also received an honorary Doctorate of Letters from the University of East Anglia on 19 July 2012.

== Public advocacy ==
Wanamaker has been a patron of the UK charity Tree Aid, since 1997. Tree Aid enables communities in Africa's drylands to fight poverty and become self-reliant, while improving the environment. In 2006 Wanamaker recorded a successful Radio 4 appeal for the charity.

She is a patron of Dignity in Dying, the Lymphoedema Support Network, Youth Music Theatre UK and of the Young Actors' Theatre, Islington. She is also one of the honorary patrons of the London children's charity Scene & Heard. Wanamaker also supports Survival International's campaign to save the threatened native tribes in Brazil.

In August 2014, Wanamaker was one of 200 public figures who were signatories to a letter to The Guardian expressing their hope that Scotland would vote to remain part of the United Kingdom in September's referendum on that issue.

Wanamaker is one of nine presidents of Better Planet Education.

== Personal life ==
Wanamaker lived for many years with fellow Royal Shakespeare Company actor David Lyon. In November 1994, she married the Scottish actor, playwright and screenwriter Gawn Grainger, who died on 17 May 2025.

Wanamaker holds both British and American citizenship, having become a British citizen in 2000.

== Filmography ==
Key
†	Denotes works that have not yet been released

=== Film ===
Year	Film	Role	Notes
1988	The Raggedy Rawney	Elle	
1997	Wilde	Ada Leverson	
1997	Swept from the Sea	Mary Foster	
2001	Harry Potter and the Philosopher's Stone	Madame Hooch	
2004	Five Children and It	Martha	
2010	It's a Wonderful Afterlife	Mrs. Goldman	
2011	My Week with Marilyn	Paula Strasberg	

=== Television ===
Year	TV Series	Role	Notes
1971	ITV Sunday Night Drama	Sally	Episode Turn of the Year: Sally for the Keeps
1971	Take Three Girls	Jackie	
1973	Late Night Theatre	Alice	Episode The Eagle has Landed
1973	Between the Wars	Ada Abbott	Episode The Silver Mask
1973	ITV Sunday Night Theatre	Lorna Green	Episode Lorna and Ted
1973	Spy Trap	Muriel	Episode Sale of Work
1974	Jennie: Lady Randolph Churchill	Pearl Craigie	TV Miniseries (1 episode) A Perfect Darling
1975	The Confederacy of Wives	Corinna	TV film
1975	Village Hall	Shirley Chatsfield	Episode Miss Health and Beauty
1975	Crown Court	Joan Carmichael	1 episode
1977	A Christmas Carol	Belle	TV film
1978	BBC Play of the Month	Lucille/Dorinda	Danton's Death / The Beaux' Stratagem
1978	The Devil's Crown	Berengaria of Navarre	3 episodes
1981	Strike: The Birth of Solidarity	Aline Pienkowska	TV film
1982	Baal	Sophie	TV film
1982	Inside the Third Reich	Annemarie Kempf	TV film
1983	Richard III	Lady Anne	TV film
1983	Enemies of the State	Zdena Tomin	TV film
1985	Edge of Darkness	Clemmy	TV Miniseries (3 episodes)
1986	Paradise Postponed	Charlie Fanner	TV Mini-series (8 episodes)
1987	Poor Little Rich Girl: The Barbara Hutton Story	Jean Kennerly	TV film
1987	Tales of The Unexpected	Margaret Smythe	1 episode Skeleton in the Cupboard
1988	Once in a Lifetime	May Daniels	TV film
1989	The Dog It was That Died	Blidebeck	TV film
1989	Ball-Trap on the Cote Sauvage	Sarah Marriot	TV film
1990	Theatre Night	Emilia	Episode Othello
1991	Inspector Morse	Emma Pickford	Episode Fat Chance
1991	Prime Suspect	Moyra Henson	TV Miniseries (2 episodes)
1992	Screen Two: Memento Mori	Olive Mannering	TV film
1992	Screenplay: The Countess Alice	Connie	TV film
1992	Shakespeare: The Animated Tales	Lady Macbeth	Episode Macbeth
1992	The Blackheath Poisonings	Charlotte Collard	TV Miniseries (3 episodes)
1992–1994	Love Hurts	Tessa Piggot/Carver	30 episodes
1995	Performance	Mrs Holroyd	Episode The Widowing of Mrs. Holroyd
1995	The English Wife	Carolina Griveau	TV film
1997	A Dance to the Music of Time	Audrey Mclintick	TV mini-series (2 episodes)
1997	Great Performances	Prologue/Herself	Episode Henry V at Shakespeare's Globe
1999	The Magical Legend of the Leprechauns	Mary Muldoon	TV miniseries
1999	David Copperfield	Miss Jane Murdstone	TV miniseries
2000	Gormenghast	Clarice Groan	TV Mini-Series (3 episodes)
2000–2011	My Family	Susan Harper	Main role. 114 episodes
2001	Adrian Mole: The Cappuccino Years	Tania Braithwaite	6 episodes
2005	Agatha Christie's Marple	Letitia Blacklock	Episode A Murder is Announced
2005	A Waste of Shame	Countess of Pembroke	BBC Four film
2005–2013	Agatha Christie's Poirot	Ariadne Oliver	6 feature-length episodes: Cards on the Table (2005); Mrs McGinty's Dead (2008); Third Girl (2008); Hallowe'en Party (2010); Elephants Can Remember (2013); Dead Man's Folly (2013)
2005, 2006	Doctor Who	Cassandra	2 episodes: "The End of the World" and "New Earth"
2006	Johnny and the Bomb	Mrs Tachyon	2 episodes
2007	The Old Curiosity Shop	Mrs Jarley	TV film
2013	Wodehouse in Exile	Ethel Wodehouse	TV film
2015	Mr Selfridge	Princess Marie	10 episodes
2017	Babs	Joan Littlewood	TV film
2018	Inside No. 9	Paula	Episode: "And the Winner Is..."
2018	Girlfriends	Gail Stanley	6 episodes
2018–2021	Britannia	Queen Antedia	Main role (10 episodes)
2019	Killing Eve	Helen Jacobsen	Episode: "Desperate Times"
2019	Worzel Gummidge	Lady Bloomsbury Barton	Episode: "The Green Man"
2021–2023	Shadow and Bone	Baghra	Main role (11 episodes)
2022	The Man Who Fell to Earth	Watt	2 episodes
2023	The Cleaner	Lucille	Episode: "The Statue"
2023	Black Ops	Celia Herrington	3 episodes
2024	Criminal Record	Maureen	5 episodes
2024	Inside No. 9	Party Guest	Episode: "Plodding On"
2025–present	Bergerac	Charlie Hungerford	Main role (6 episodes)
2025–present	Professor T.	Zelda Radclyffe	Supporting role

=== Video games ===
Year	Video game	Role	Note
2008	Fable II	Theresa	
2010	Fable III	Theresa	
2012	Fable: The Journey	Theresa	
2018	Harry Potter: Hogwarts Mystery	Madam Hooch	

=== Theatre ===
Year	Play	Role	Location
1970	A Midsummer Night's Dream	Hermia	University Theatre, Manchester
1970	Creditors	Tealk	University Theatre, Manchester
1970	The Cherry Orchard	Anya	Stables Theatre Club, Manchester
1971	Pictures in a Bath of Acid	Fanny Falkner	West Yorkshire Playhouse, Leeds
1971	Family Album	Emily Valance	West Yorkshire Playhouse, Leeds
1971	Twelfth Night	Olivia	West Yorkshire Playhouse, Leeds
1971	Dick Whittington	Tommy the Cat	Royal Lyceum Theatre, Edinburgh
1971	The Hostage	Teresa	Royal Lyceum Theatre, Edinburgh
1972	The Birthday Party	Lulu	Royal Lyceum Theatre, Edinburgh
1972	When Thou Art King	Lady Percy/Doll	Far East Tour
1972	Guys and Dolls	Miss Adelaide	University Theatre, Manchester
1973	The Provoked Wife	Belinda	Watford Palace Theatre
1973	Twelfth Night	Viola	Tour
1973	Jack and the Beanstalk	Margery, the Baron's daughter	Cambridge Arts Theatre
1974	She Stoops to Conquer	Constance Neville	Tour
1974	French Without Tears	Jacqueline Maingot	Tour
1974	Cabaret	Sally Bowles	Redgrave Theatre, Farnham
1974	Tom Thumb	Princess Huncamunca	The Young Vic
1974	Much Ado About Nothing	Hero	The Young Vic
1975	Kiss Me Kate	Bianca	Oxford Playhouse
1975	The Taming of the Shrew	Katherina	Tour
1975	The Beggar's Opera	Mrs. Vixen/Lucy Locket	Nottingham Playhouse
1975	Jug	Eva Hirst	Nottingham Playhouse
1975	A Streetcar Named Desire	Stella Kowalski	Nottingham Playhouse
1976	Pygmalion	Eliza Doolittle	Nottingham Playhouse
1976	The Servant of Two Masters	Smeraldina	Nottingham Playhouse
1976	The Devil's Disciple	Essie	Aldwych Theatre
1976	Ivanov	Babakina, Marfa Yegorovna	Aldwych Theatre
1976	Wild Oats; or, The Strolling Gentleman	Jane	Aldwych Theatre
1978	The Taming of the Shrew	Bianca	The Other Place, Stratford-upon-Avon
1978	Captain Swing	Gemma Beech	The Other Place, Stratford-upon-Avon
1979	Piaf	Toine	The Other Place, Stratford-upon-Avon
1979	Once in a Lifetime	May Daniels	Aldwych Theatre
1981	Piaf	Toine	Plymouth Theatre, New York City
1982	The Importance of Being Earnest	Gwendoline	Royal National Theatre
1983	The Time of Your Life	Kitty Duval	The Other Place, Stratford-upon-Avon
1983	Twelfth Night	Viola	Royal Shakespeare Theatre, Stratford-upon-Avon
1983	The Comedy of Errors	Adriana	Royal Shakespeare Theatre, Stratford-upon-Avon
1984	Mother Courage and her Children	Kattrin	Barbican Centre
1986	Loot	Fay	Manhattan Theatre Club; Music Box Theatre, New York City
1986	The Bay at Nice and Wrecked Eggs	Sophia/Grace	Royal National Theatre
1988	Mrs Klein	Paula	Royal National Theatre; Apollo Theatre
1989	Othello	Emilia	The Other Place, Stratford-upon-Avon; The Young Vic
1990	The Crucible	Elizabeth Proctor	Royal National Theatre
1993	The Last Yankee	Patricia Hamilton	The Young Vic
1994	Dead Funny	Eleanor	Hampstead Theatre; Vaudeville Theatre
1995	The Glass Menagerie	Amanda Wingfield	Donmar Warehouse; Comedy Theatre
1996	Sylvia	Sylvia	Apollo Theatre
1997–1999	Electra	Electra	Minerva Theatre; Donmar Warehouse; McCarter Theatre, Princeton; Ethel Barrymore Theatre, New York City
1998	The Old Neighbourhood	Jolly	Duke of York's Theatre
1999	Battle Royal	Queen Caroline	Royal National Theatre
2001	Boston Marriage	Anna	Donmar Warehouse; Ambassadors Theatre
2003	His Girl Friday	Hildy Johnson	Royal National Theatre
2006	Awake and Sing!	Bessie	Belasco Theatre, New York City
2007	The Rose Tattoo	Serafina del Rose	Royal National Theatre
2007	Much Ado About Nothing	Beatrice	Royal National Theatre
2010	All My Sons	Kate Keller	Apollo Theatre
2011	The Cherry Orchard	Madame Ranevskaya	Royal National Theatre
2013	Passion Play	Eleanor	Duke of York's Theatre
2014–2015	Stevie	Stevie	Minerva Theatre; Hampstead Theatre
2015	All On Her Own and Harlequinade	Rosemary/Dame Maud Gosport	Garrick Theatre
2016	Elegy	Lorna	Donmar Warehouse
2018	The Birthday Party	Meg	Harold Pinter Theatre
2019	Two Ladies	Helene	Bridge Theatre
2021	Constellations	Marianne	Vaudeville Theatre
2023	Pictures From Home	Jean	Studio 54, New York City

== Awards and nominations ==
- For her stage work, Wanamaker has been nominated four times for the United States' most prestigious theatre award the Tony and nine times for the most prestigious British theatre award the Olivier, winning two.
- For her screen work, Wanamaker has received three BAFTA nominations.

Year given is year of ceremony.

Year	Award	Category	Nominated work	Result	Ref
1979	Olivier Award	Actress of the Year in a Revival	Once in a Lifetime	Won	
1981	Tony Award	Best Featured in a Play	Piaf!	Nominated	
1981	Drama Desk Award	Outstanding Featured Actress in a Play	Piaf!	Nominated	
1984	Olivier Award	Actress of the Year in a Revival	Twelfth Night	Nominated	
1984	Olivier Award	Best Actress in a Supporting Role	The Time of Your Life	Nominated	
1985	Olivier Award	Best Performance in a Supporting Role	Mother Courage	Nominated	
1986	Tony Award	Best Featured Actress in a Play	Loot	Nominated	
1986	Drama Desk Award	Outstanding Featured Actress in a Play	Loot	Nominated	
1989/90	Olivier Award	Best Performance in a Supporting Role	Othello	Nominated	
1991	Olivier Award	Best Actress in a Supporting Role	The Crucible	Nominated	
1992	BAFTA TV Award	Best Actress	Prime Suspect	Nominated	
1993	BAFTA TV Award	Best Actress	Love Hurts	Nominated	
1996	Olivier Award	Best Actress	The Glass Menagerie	Nominated	
1998	BAFTA Film Award	Best Supporting Actress	Wilde	Nominated	
1998	Olivier Award	Best Actress	Electra	Won	
1999	Tony Award	Best Actress in a Play	Electra	Nominated	
1999	Drama Desk Award	Outstanding Actress in a Play	Electra	Nominated	
2002	Olivier Award	Best Actress	Boston Marriage	Nominated	
2006	Tony Award	Best Featured Actress in a Play	Awake and Sing!	Nominated	

- In 2006, Wanamaker and the rest of the cast of Awake and Sing! won a special Drama Desk award for Outstanding Ensemble Performance.

== See also ==
- Independent Jewish Voices
