= Steven Johnson =

Steven Johnson may refer to:

== Sports ==
- Steven Johnson (American football) (born 1988), American linebacker in the National Football League
- Steven Johnson (racing driver) (born 1974), Australian V8 Supercar racing driver
- Steven Johnson (field hockey) (1929-2009), British Olympic hockey player

== Politics ==
- Steven C. Johnson (Kansas politician), American politician and member of the Kansas House of Representatives
- Steven C. Johnson (Maryland politician), American politician and member of the Maryland House of Delegates
- Steve Johnson (Michigan politician), American politician and member of the Michigan House of Representatives

== Other ==
- Steven Johnson (author) (born 1968), American popular science author
- Steven Johnson, drummer for Alabama Shakes
- Steven G. Johnson (born 1973), American mathematician
- Steven M. Johnson (born 1938), American cartoonist, futurist, and inventor

== See also ==
- Steve Johnson (disambiguation)
- Stephen Johnson (disambiguation)
- Stevens–Johnson syndrome, a type of severe skin reaction
