= Steve Johnson =

Steve Johnson may refer to:

== Sports ==
=== American football ===
- Steve Johnson (coach) (born 1956), American football coach
- Steve Johnson (tight end) (born 1965), American football player
- Stevie Johnson (born 1986), American football wide receiver

=== Other sports ===
- Steve Johnson (Australian footballer) (born 1983), Australian Football League player
- Steve Johnson (baseball) (born 1987), Major League Baseball pitcher
- Steve Johnson (basketball) (born 1957), American former National Basketball Association player
- Stevie Johnson (basketball) (born 1978), American basketball player who played overseas
- Steve Johnson (cricketer) (born 1944), former English cricketer
- Steve Johnson (English footballer) (born 1957), former footballer
- Steve Johnson (racing driver) (born 1974), Australian racing driver
- Steve Johnson (rugby union), former Leicester Tigers and England blindside flanker
- Steve Johnson (tennis) (born 1989), American tennis player

== Other people ==
- Steve Johnson (AOL), former AOL vice-president
- Steve Johnson (Colorado politician) (born 1960), member of the Colorado State Senate
- Steve Johnson (director) (born 1972), English film director
- Steve Johnson (Michigan politician) (born 1990), member of the Michigan House of Representatives
- Steve Johnson (special effects artist) (born 1960), American special effects artist

== Characters ==
- Steve Johnson (Days of Our Lives), a character on Days of Our Lives

== See also ==
- Steven Johnson (disambiguation)
- Stephen Johnson (disambiguation)
- Stefan Johansson (born 1956), former Formula One driver from Sweden
- Steve Johnston (born 1971), Australian international motorcycle speedway rider
- Stevens–Johnson syndrome
