= Nayantaquit Trail =

US hiking trail

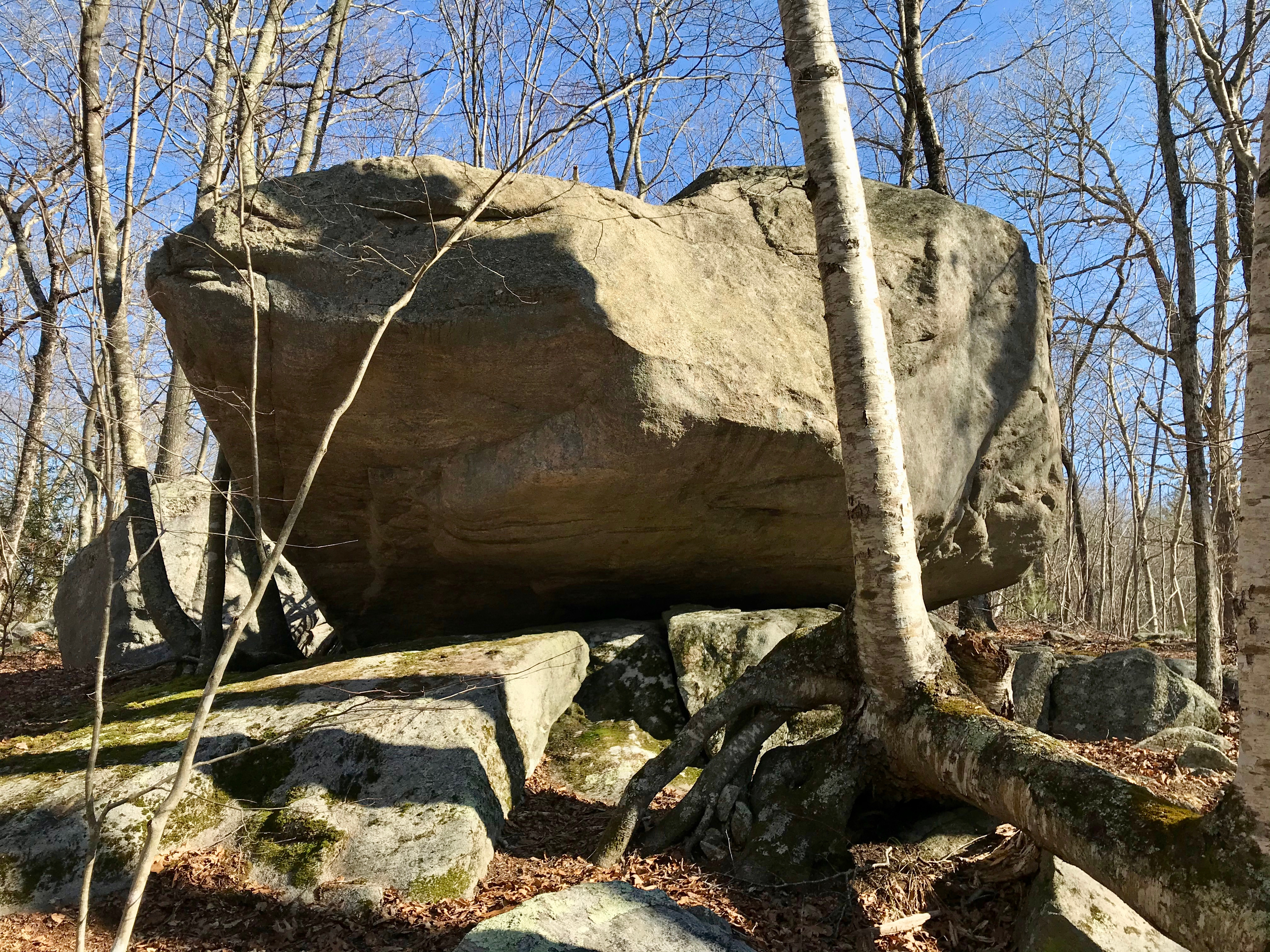
- Large Erratic Boulder and unusual tree bough near the start of the Nayantaquit Trail loop in Nehantic State Park's western block.
- Length: 7 miles (11 km)
- Location: Lyme Connecticut, USA
- Designation: CFPA Blue-Blazed Trail
- Use: hiking, cross-country skiing, snowshoeing, fishing, geocaching, other
- Hazards: hunters, deer ticks, poison ivy

The Nayantaquit Trail is a 7-mile (11 km) Blue-Blazed hiking trail system in Lyme Connecticut and is entirely in the Nehantic State Forest western block. Parking for the trail can be found at several locations on Keeny Road inside the state forest.

Today it is composed of a 4.6-mile (7.4 km) main loop trail plus two shorter side trails—the a 0.6-mile (0.97 km) 'Cross Over Trail' (which bisects the main loop trail) and the 0.8-mile (1.3 km) Uncas Pond Connector trail which connects the main loop trail to Uncas Pond.

Notable features include summits and boulders (primarily glacial erratics).

== Trail description ==
The Nayantaquit Trail is primarily used for hiking, backpacking, picnicking, and in the winter, snowshoeing.

Portions of the trail are suitable for, and are used for, cross-country skiing and geocaching. Site-specific activities enjoyed along the route include bird watching, hunting (very limited), fishing, bouldering and rock climbing (limited).

=== Trail route ===
The Nayantaquit mainline trail is a loop trail which is connected to a dirt parking lot off of the park dirt road portion of Keeny Road inside the Nehantic State Forest western block.

The trail system summits or travels near by the ridges and peaks of several high points.

The trail is entirely within the Nehantic State Forest.

=== Trail communities ===
The official Blue-Blazed Nayantaquit Trail is located in the Hamburg section of Lyme Connecticut.

== History and folklore ==
The Blue-Blazed Nayantaquit Trail was created by the Connecticut Forest and Park Association.

=== Historic sites ===
The name Nayantaquit is named after an indigenous tribe which inhabited the area of the western Nehantic State Forest block in Lyme Connecticut.

== Hiking the trail ==
The mainline trail is blazed with blue rectangles. Trail descriptions are available from a number of commercial and non-commercial sources, and a complete guidebook is published by the Connecticut Forest and Park Association

Wearing bright orange clothing during the hunting season (Fall through December) is recommended.

== See also ==
- Blue-Blazed Trails
- Lyme Connecticut
- Nehantic State Forest
