= Emily Goodrich Smith =

American newspaper correspondent (1830–1903)

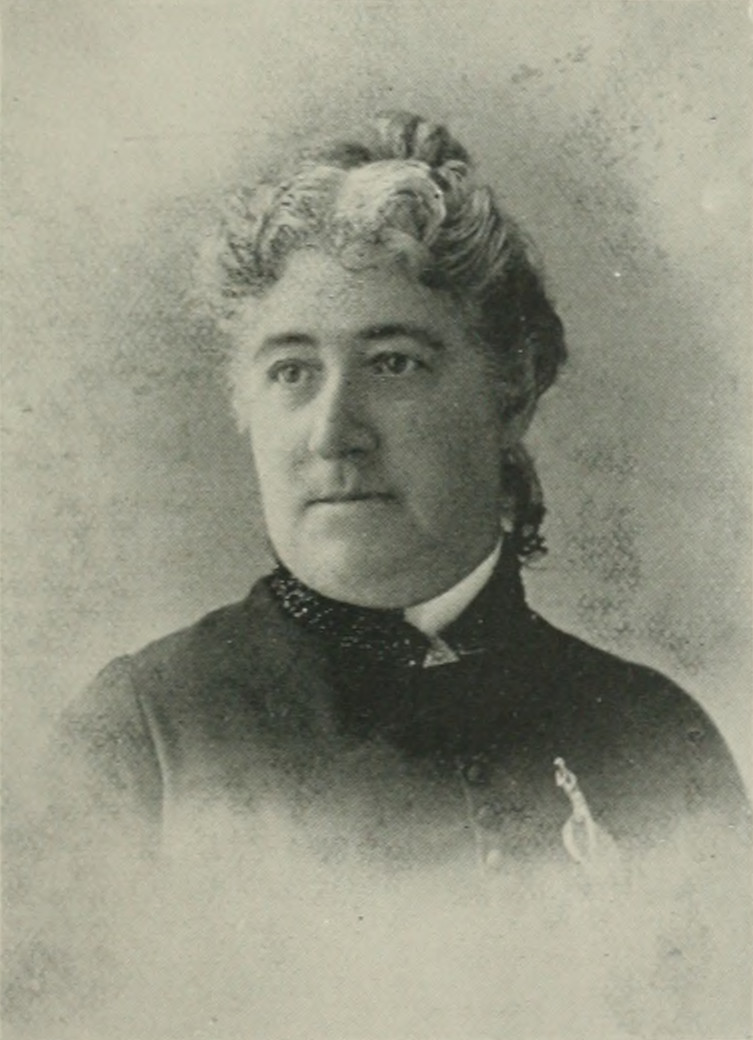
- Portrait photo from A Woman of the Century
- Born: Emily L. Goodrich; June 1, 1830; Boston, Massachusetts, U.S.
- Died: July 12, 1903 (aged 73); Waterbury, Connecticut, U.S.
- Occupation: newspaper correspondent
- Spouse: Nathaniel Smith (m. 1856–1877)
- Relatives: Samuel Griswold Goodrich (father); James Ely (great-grandfather); Thomas Welles (ancestor)

Emily Goodrich Smith (1830–1903) was an American newspaper correspondent. Her father, Hon. Samuel Griswold Goodrich, widely known as "Peter Parley", was consul in Paris, affording an opportunity for Smith to be educated abroad. While living in Paris, in 1848, she witnessed the terrors enacted during the reign of Louis Philippe I. The Goodrich house was constantly filled with terror-stricken foreigners, who found their only safety under the protection of the American flag. Returning to the U.S., in 1856, she wrote many stories and verses for magazines, her letters during the civil war were widely read and copied. She was one of the founders of the Chautauqua Literary and Scientific Circle (CLSC) and state secretary for Connecticut. She also served as a vice-regent of the Mount Vernon Ladies' Association for Connecticut.

== Early life and education ==
Emily L. Goodrich was born in the old Hancock house, Boston, Massachusetts, June 1, 1830. She was the oldest daughter of the Hon. Samuel Griswold Goodrich. Her mother was Miss Mary Boott, (Note: It is recorded in The Descendants of John Porter (1893) that Emily's mother was Adeline Gratia Bradley, who died in 1822, but as Emily was born in 1829, this is incorrect. It is more likely that Emily's mother is Mary Boott, which was recorded by Willard & Livermore (1893), among others.) of an English family of position.

Her great-grandfather was James Ely, of Lyme, Connecticut, a Revolutionary officer. Thomas Welles, former Colonial Governor of Connecticut, was another ancestor. Mrs. Smith was a direct descendant of soldiers of the War of 1812, the Mexican–American War , and the wife of an officer of the civil war.

Being obliged to go abroad, Emily's parents placed her in the Inglis-McCleod school. Her education continued later in France and Italy, where every opportunity for study was given her, and she became an accomplished linguist. In 1846, in Paris, she was presented at the court of Louis Philippe I and saw the throne of the "citizen king" broken and burned in the French Revolution of 1848. At that time, she took her first lesson in caring for the wounded. The court of the hotel was filled with men shot down by the soldiery. A mob of 90,000 controlled the city three days. For 20 hours, Alphonse de Lamartine held them by his eloquence, and Miss Goodrich stood on a balcony near when the rabble hurled down a statue and thrust him into its niche.

While her father served as consul in Paris, she assisted her mother in hosting foreign and domestic dignitaries. During a period of unrest in Paris, the American Consulate and Mr. Goodrich’s house sheltered foreign nationals who sought safety under the protection of the American flag.

Miss Goodrich was presented at the Court of St James's at the time of the first Great Exhibition.

== Career ==
In 1856, she returned to the United States and married Nathaniel Smith (d. 1877), of Connecticut, a grandson of Nathan Smith who was Senator in the days when Congress sat in Philadelphia, and chief justice of Connecticut. The young couple went to live in Newburgh, New York, where her husband engaged in law. The panic of 1857 drove her husband back to Woodbury, where they lived in the Smith house, which was destroyed January 2, 1885, with all its priceless treasures.

In 1861, Mrs. Smith followed her husband to the civil war, where she remained with him for two years. He was injured in an explosion, but his death did not occur till some years after the war had ended. "Mrs. Colonel", as the soldiers called her, was mentioned in the State reports as being very efficient in tent and hospital.

She wrote many stories and some verse for various magazines. During her years in Paris and the stirring times thereafter, she was correspondent of a New York City daily. Her letters during the war and accounts of the Centennial Exposition were widely read and copied.

For many years, she lived in Woodbury, Connecticut, but later moved to Waterbury, Connecticut. From 1873 til 1893, she was more or less connected with the newspapers, and was for two years secretary of the large correspondence association of the American.

In 1883, to help others, she became a co-founder of the CLSC, and she was one of ten in Connecticut who, in 1891, were enrolled in the highest order of Chautauqua degrees. When Mount Vernon was to be purchased by the women of America, Smith was appointed first vice-regent of the Mount Vernon Ladies' Association for Connecticut, and her daughter was one of her most valued assistants. She was also a member of Millicent Porter Chapter of the Daughters of the American Revolution, of Waterbury. She was also an agent for the Humane Society.

== Death ==
Emily Goodrich Smith died at Waterbury, Connecticut, July 12, 1903.

== Selected works ==
- "'Peter Parley'-As Known To His Daughter.", The Connecticut Magazine, 1898
