= Stephen Johnson =

Stephen Johnson may refer to:

- Stephen Johnson (minister) (1724–1786), Connecticut minister and pamphleteer
- Stephen Johnson (missionary) (1803–1886), first Protestant missionary to Fuzhou
- Stephen C. Johnson, computer scientist, mathematician and Unix specialist
- Stephen C. Johnson (politician), New York state senator 1844 to 1847
- Stephen E. Johnson (born 1955), U.S. Navy admiral
- Stephen L. Johnson (politician, born 1951), career civil servant and U.S. Administrator of the Environmental Protection Agency (EPA)
- Stephen L. Johnson (politician, born 1939), member of the Washington Senate
- Stephen Maxwell Johnson (fl.1980s–present), Australian filmmaker
- Stephen R. Johnson (1952–2015), animator and music video director who worked with Peter Gabriel and Talking Heads
- Stephen Baron Johnson (born 1972), American artist
- Stephen Douglas Johnson (1963–2003), American banking lawyer and lobbyist
- Stephen T. Johnson (born 1950), United States Marine Corps general
- Stephen Johnson (ice hockey), retired player for Hull Stingrays
- Ted Johnson (politician) (Stephen Edward Ingram Johnson), Australian politician

== See also ==
- Steve Johnson (disambiguation)
- Steven Johnson (disambiguation)
- Stevens–Johnson syndrome
