= Cooper Site =

Cooper Site may refer to:

- Cooper Bison Kill Site, Oklahoma. A prehistoric archaeological site of the Folsom tradition.
- Cooper Site (Lyme, Connecticut), listed on the National Register of Historic Places in New London County, Connecticut
- Cooper Site (Onamia, Minnesota), listed on the National Register of Historic Places in Mille Lacs County, Minnesota
