= Justin Amash =

American politician (born 1980)

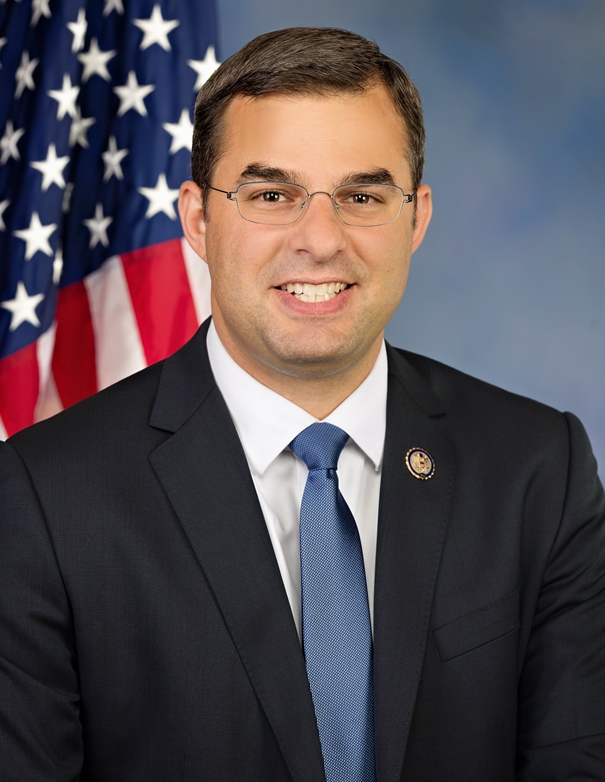
- Official portrait, 2015

Member of the U.S. House of Representatives from Michigan's 3rd district
- In office January 3, 2011 – January 3, 2021
- Preceded by: Vern Ehlers
- Succeeded by: Peter Meijer

Member of the Michigan House of Representatives from the 72nd district
- In office January 14, 2009 – January 1, 2011
- Preceded by: Glenn Steil
- Succeeded by: Ken Yonker

Personal details
- Born: April 18, 1980 (age 46) Grand Rapids, Michigan, U.S.
- Party: Libertarian (2020–2024, since 2025)
- Other political affiliations: Republican (before 2019, 2024); Independent (2019–2020)
- Spouse: Kara Day
- Children: 3
- Education: University of Michigan (BA, JD)

Justin A. Amash (/əˈmɑːʃ/ ə-MAHSH; born April 18, 1980) is an American lawyer and politician who served as the U.S. representative for Michigan's 3rd congressional district from 2011 to 2021. He was the second Palestinian-American and Syrian-American member of Congress. (Note: Mary Rose Oakar was the first Syrian American in Congress. John E. Sununu was the first Palestinian American in Congress.) Originally a Republican, Amash became an independent in 2019. He joined the Libertarian Party the following year, leaving Congress in January 2021 as the only Libertarian to serve in Congress. Amash returned to the Republican Party in 2024 to run for the senate. Amash promptly returned to the Libertarian Party in 2025 after his primary loss.

Amash received national attention when he became the first Republican congressman to call for the impeachment of Donald Trump, a position he maintained after leaving the party.

Amash formed an exploratory committee to seek the Libertarian Party presidential nomination in the 2020 election, before announcing in May of that year that he would not run for president. He did not seek reelection to Congress in 2020.

== Early life and education ==
Justin A. Amash was born on April 18, 1980, in Grand Rapids, Michigan. He is the second of three sons born to Arab Christian parents who had immigrated to the United States. His father, Attallah Amash, is a Palestinian Christian whose family lived in Ramla until they were forcibly expelled by Israeli soldiers during the Nakba. Attallah and his family immigrated to the United States in 1956 when he was 16 through the sponsorship of an American pastor in Muskegon, Michigan. Amash's mother, Mimi, is a Syrian Christian who met his father through family friends in Damascus, Syria, and the two married in 1974.

Amash grew up in Kentwood, Michigan. He first attended Kelloggsville Christian School in Kentwood, then Grand Rapids Christian High School, from which he graduated in 1998 as class valedictorian. He then attended the University of Michigan, graduating in 2002 with a Bachelor of Arts degree in economics with high honors. Amash then attended the University of Michigan Law School, graduating with a Juris Doctor in 2005. He was influenced by Richard Primus's Constitutional Law class: “I really gained an appreciation for constitutional interpretation, for the ideals this country was founded on. His class made me an ardent defender of the Constitution and made me more excited about getting into politics someday.”

== Early career ==
After graduating from law school, Amash spent less than a year as a lawyer at the Grand Rapids law firm Varnum LLP. He then became a consultant to Michigan Industrial Tools Inc. (also known as Tekton Inc.), a company his father founded and owns. He worked for his family's business for a year before being elected to the Michigan House of Representatives in 2008. Amash's two brothers also have positions at Michigan Industrial Tools.

== Early political career ==
=== Michigan House of Representatives ===
Glenn Steil Sr., the incumbent state representative for Michigan's 72nd House District, was unable to run for reelection in the 2008 election due to term limits. Amash ran in the Republican primary and defeated four other candidates before defeating Democratic nominee Albert Abbasse in the general election.

During his initial tenure in the State House, Amash sponsored five resolutions and twelve bills, none of which were passed. While in the State House, he began using his Twitter and Facebook pages to report his floor votes and explain his reasoning and had a government transparency page on his website that would allow people to view the members and salaries of his staff.

== U.S. House of Representatives ==
=== Republican (2011–2019) ===
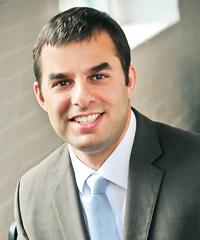
Amash during his tenure as a U.S. Representative, 2013

On February 9, 2010, Amash announced that he would run for the Republican nomination for Michigan's third congressional district and the next day incumbent Representative Vern Ehlers announced that he would not seek reelection. During the primary campaign he was endorsed by Betsy and Dick DeVos, the Club for Growth, Representative Ron Paul, and FreedomWorks PAC. In the Republican primary he defeated four other candidates and shortly before the general election he was named as one of Time magazine's "40 under 40 – Rising Stars of U.S. Politics". During the campaign he advocated politics supported by the Tea Party movement and defeated Democratic nominee Patrick Miles Jr. in the general election.

The House Republican Steering Committee removed Amash from the House Budget Committee on December 3, 2012, as part of a larger party leadership-caucus shift. He joined Representatives Tim Huelskamp and David Schweikert in a letter to Speaker of the House John Boehner, demanding to know why they had lost their committee positions. A spokesperson for Republican Congressman Lynn Westmoreland of Georgia said that Amash, Huelskamp, and Schweikert had been removed for "their inability to work with other members." Politico said that the three were "the first members pulled off committees as punishment for political or personality reasons in nearly two decades".

Following the retirement of Senator Carl Levin it was speculated that Amash would run in the 2014 Senate election and Senator Mike Lee encouraged him to run, but Amash chose to run for reelection to the House.

Amash was endorsed by the fiscally conservative Club for Growth PAC, which spent over $500,000 supporting Amash in his Republican primary against former East Grand Rapids School Trustee Brian Ellis, who was endorsed by the U.S. Chamber of Commerce and spent more than $1 million of his own money on the race.

After Amash defeated Ellis in the August primary, with 57% of the vote to Ellis's 43%, Amash was highly critical of Ellis and former Congressman Pete Hoekstra, who had backed Ellis. Of Hoekstra, Amash said, "You are a disgrace. And I'm glad we could hand you one more loss before you fade into total obscurity and irrelevance." Amash took exception to one of Ellis's television ads that quoted California Republican Congressman Devin Nunes calling Amash "Al Qaeda's best friend in Congress"; he demanded an apology from Ellis for running what he called a "disgusting, despicable smear campaign." As Conor Friedersdorf of The Atlantic notes, "Amash voted against the reauthorization of the Patriot Act, favored a measure to repeal indefinite detention, and opposed reauthorization of the FISA Amendments Act." In the general election, Amash won reelection against Democratic nominee Bob Goodrich.

In 2011, Amash endorsed Representative Ron Paul's campaign for the Republican presidential nomination. In 2015, he endorsed Senator Rand Paul's campaign for the Republican presidential nomination and later endorsed Senator Ted Cruz after Paul dropped out.

From 2011 to 2019, Amash missed only one of 5,374 roll call votes.

==== Independent (2019–2020) ====
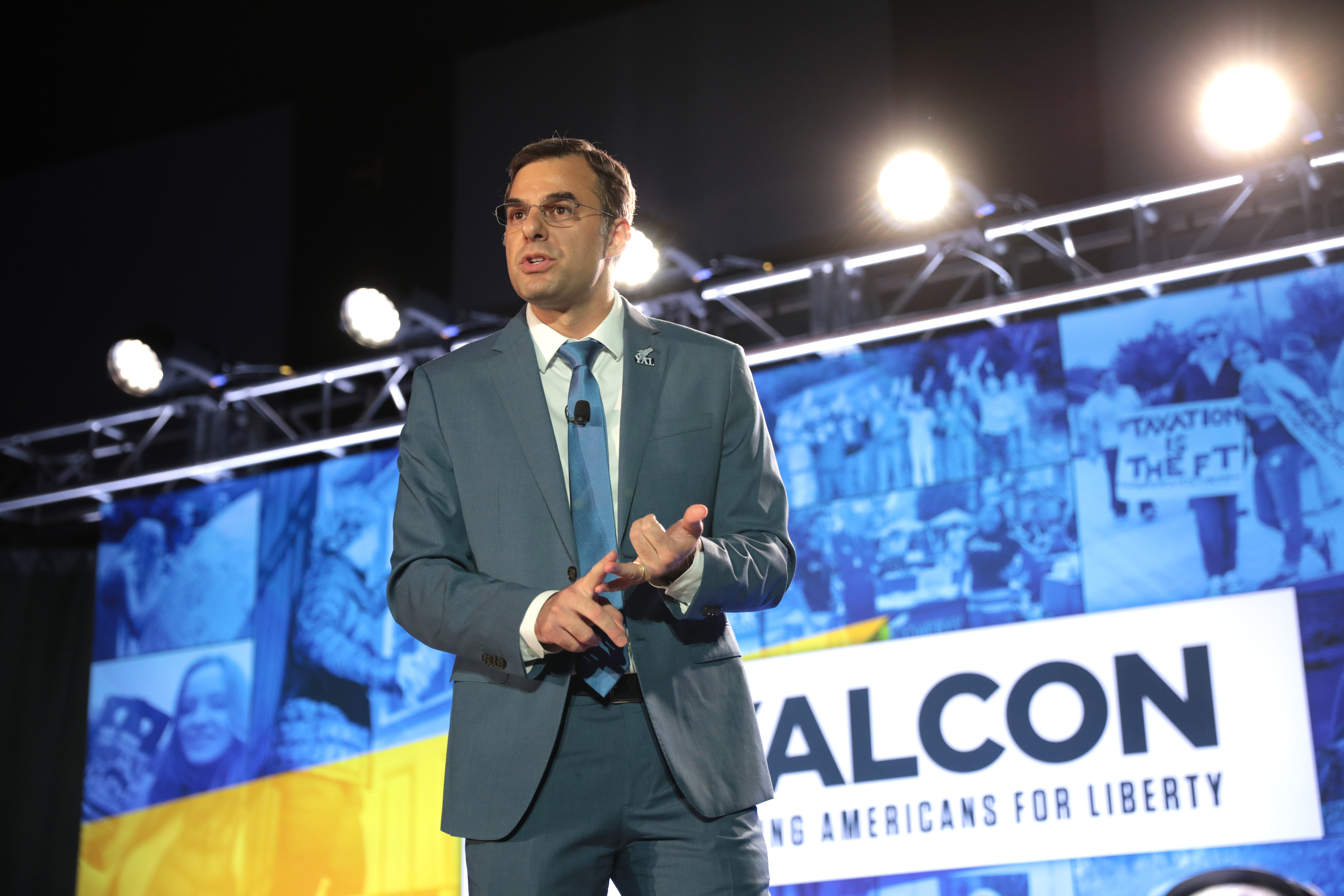
Amash at the 2019 Young Americans for Liberty Convention

In a July 4, 2019 op-ed, Amash announced that he was leaving the Republican Party and becoming an independent. In his op-ed, he said:

We are fast approaching the point where Congress exists as little more than a formality to legitimize outcomes dictated by the president, the speaker of the House and the Senate majority leader...

Most Americans are not rigidly partisan and do not feel well represented by either of the two major parties. In fact, the parties have become more partisan in part because they are catering to fewer people, as Americans are rejecting party affiliation in record numbers.

No matter your circumstance, I’m asking you to join me in rejecting the partisan loyalties and rhetoric that divide and dehumanize us. If we continue to take America for granted, we will lose it.

On July 8, 2019, Amash formally submitted his resignation from the Party to Republican Leader Kevin McCarthy and House Republican Conference Leader Liz Cheney. In the process, he resigned his seat on the Committee on Oversight and Reform. Amash thus became the only independent in the House of Representatives, and the first independent in the House since Bernie Sanders of Vermont (who left the House in 2007 after being elected to the Senate); and one of three independents in the United States Congress, along with Sanders and Senator Angus King of Maine.

==== Libertarian (2020–2021) ====
In April 2020, Amash joined the Libertarian Party. In doing so, Amash became the first Libertarian member to serve in either house of Congress.

In July 2020, Amash announced that he would not seek re-election to the House, saying that he would "miss" representing his constituency in Congress.

==== 2020 presidential exploratory committee ====
On April 28, 2020, after months of speculation that he would enter the presidential race, Amash announced the formation of an exploratory committee to seek the Libertarian presidential nomination. On May 16, he withdrew his name from consideration for the Libertarian nomination, citing increased political polarization and economic effects of the COVID-19 pandemic that would make campaigning difficult.

==== Committee assignments ====
- None (July 8, 2019–January 3, 2021) (116th)
- Committee on Oversight and Government Reform (January 3, 2019–July 8, 2019) (116th)
- Subcommittee on Civil Rights and Civil Liberties (116th)
- Subcommittee on National Security (116th)
- Committee on Oversight and Government Reform (115th)
  - Subcommittee on Information Technology (115th)
  - Subcommittee on National Security (115th)
- Committee on Oversight and Government Reform (114th)
  - Subcommittee on National Security (114th)
- Joint Economic Committee (114th)
- Committee on Oversight and Government Reform (113th)
  - Subcommittee on Government Operations (113th)
  - Subcommittee on National Security (113th)
- Joint Economic Committee (113th)
- Committee on Oversight and Government Reform (112th)
  - Subcommittee on Government Organization, Efficiency and Financial Management (112th)
  - Subcommittee on TARP, Financial Services and Bailouts of Public and Private Programs (112th)
- Joint Economic Committee (112th)
- Committee on the Budget (112th)

==== Caucus memberships ====
- Freedom Caucus (Founding member); resigned from the caucus June 10, 2019.
- Liberty Caucus (Founder and chairman)
- Second Amendment Caucus (Founding member)

=== Post-U.S. House ===
In May 2022, Amash spoke at the Libertarian Party National Convention.

In November 2022, Amash tweeted that he would be willing to serve as a "nonpartisan" Speaker of the United States House of Representatives, receiving support from Colorado Governor Jared Polis. During the voting for the Speaker on January 4, 2023, Amash arrived at the U.S. Capitol in order to offer himself as a candidate, but did not receive any votes. In an interview with Reason, he said he would "Open up the process" for creating and passing legislation and criticized Speaker candidate Kevin McCarthy as someone who "cares only about power" rather than policy. He says that “If we want to get back to a world where we’re talking about policies rather than personalities, you have to let everyone participate. Allowing the legislative process to work will disempower the theatrics."

=== Career after Congress ===
==== 2024 U.S. Senate candidacy ====
In January 2024, Amash announced an exploratory committee to consider running in the 2024 United States Senate election in Michigan as a Republican. On February 29, 2024, he formally announced his entry into the race.

On August 6, 2024, Amash lost the primary election to former U.S. Representative Mike Rogers. He received 15.7% of the vote, a distant second.

==== 2025 LNC Chair candidacy ====
Following the resignation of former Libertarian National Committee Chair Angela McArdle, Amash announced that he was considering running for the vacant position. He later declined any nominations for Chair.

== Political positions ==
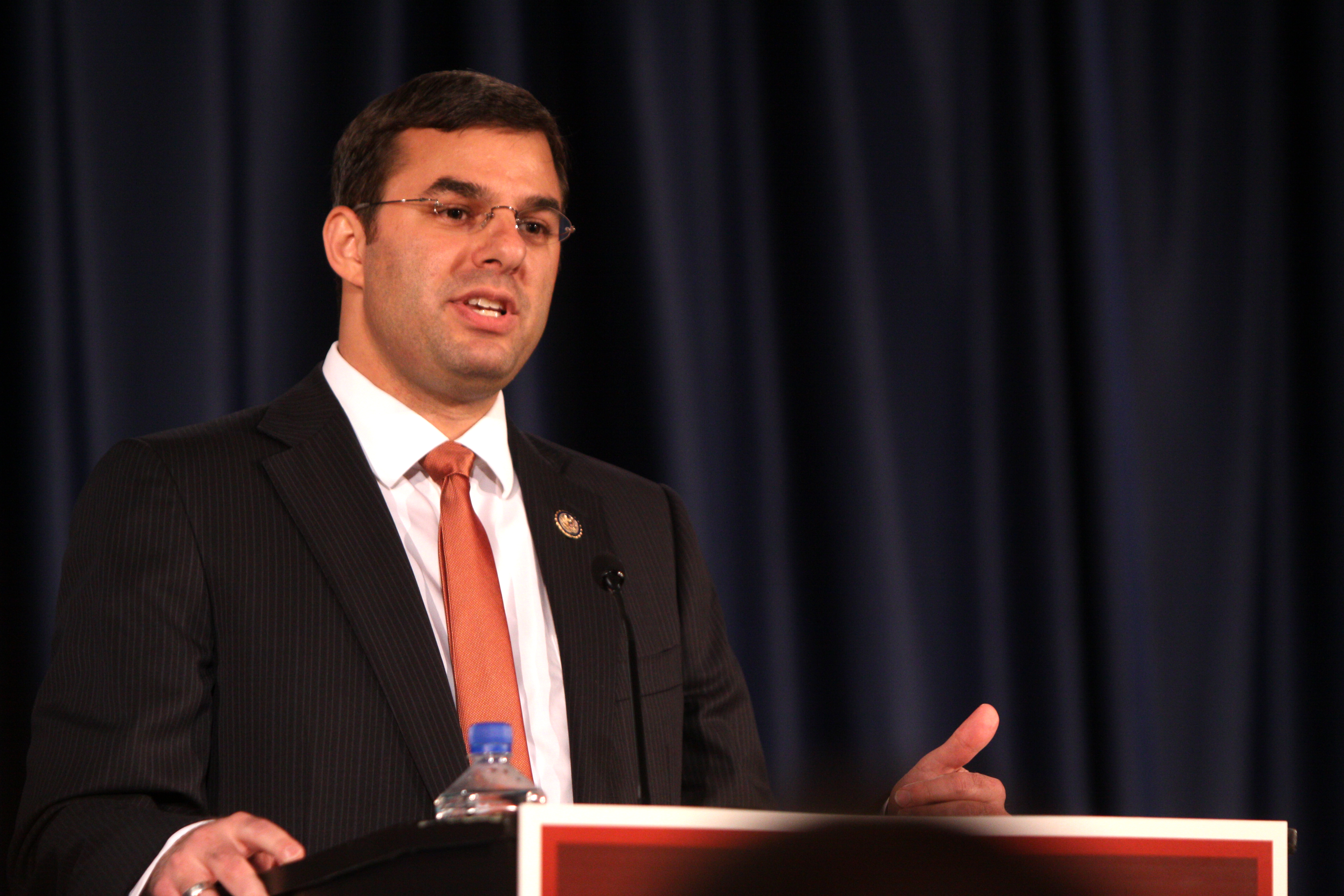
Amash at the 2012 Liberty Political Action Conference

Amash has described himself as a libertarian, dissenting from both Republican and Democratic leadership more frequently than the vast majority of Republican members of Congress. Amash was regarded as one of the most libertarian members of Congress, receiving high scores from right-leaning interest groups such as the Club for Growth, Heritage Action, and Americans for Prosperity, and praise from limited-government think tanks and nonprofit organizations. He was a founding member of the House Freedom Caucus, a group of conservative Republicans in the House. In June 2019, Amash left the caucus. On July 4, 2019, he announced that he was leaving the Republican Party to become an independent. He officially announced his membership in the Libertarian Party in April 2020.

Before leaving the GOP, Amash gained a reputation as a gadfly within the Republican Party; his staunchly libertarian and sometimes contrarian views resulted at times in disagreements with party leadership and other members of the Michigan congressional delegation. Amash has been outspoken about the American two-party system. In a 2020 interview, he argued that national politicians now focused on media perception of their party, whereas "the actual process of legislating is all but forgotten."

Amash has called economists F. A. Hayek and Frédéric Bastiat his "biggest heroes" and political inspirations and has described himself as "Hayekian libertarian." When The New York Times asked him to explain his approach to voting on legislation, he replied, "I follow a set of principles. I follow the Constitution. And that's what I base my votes on. Limited government, economic freedom, and individual liberty."

=== Domestic ===
==== Abortion ====
Amash opposes abortion and federal funding for abortion. He describes himself as "100 percent pro-life" and in 2017 voted in favor of federal legislation to ban most abortions after 20 weeks of pregnancy.

Amash voted "present", rather than "yes" or "no", on the 2011 Full Year Continuing Appropriations Act, which provided for the cessation of federal funding to Planned Parenthood. Although he supports eliminating federal funding for Planned Parenthood, he abstained from defunding legislation, arguing that "legislation that names a specific private organization to defund (rather than all organizations that engage in a particular activity) is improper" and an "arguably unconstitutional" bill of attainder.

In May 2012, Amash was one of seven Republicans to vote against the Prenatal Non-Discrimination Act, which would have made it a crime for a doctor to perform an abortion on a woman who wants to end a pregnancy based on the gender of the fetus. He criticized the bill as ineffective and virtually impossible to enforce, and said Congress "should not criminalize thought", while maintaining that he believes "all abortion should be illegal".

==== D.C. statehood ====
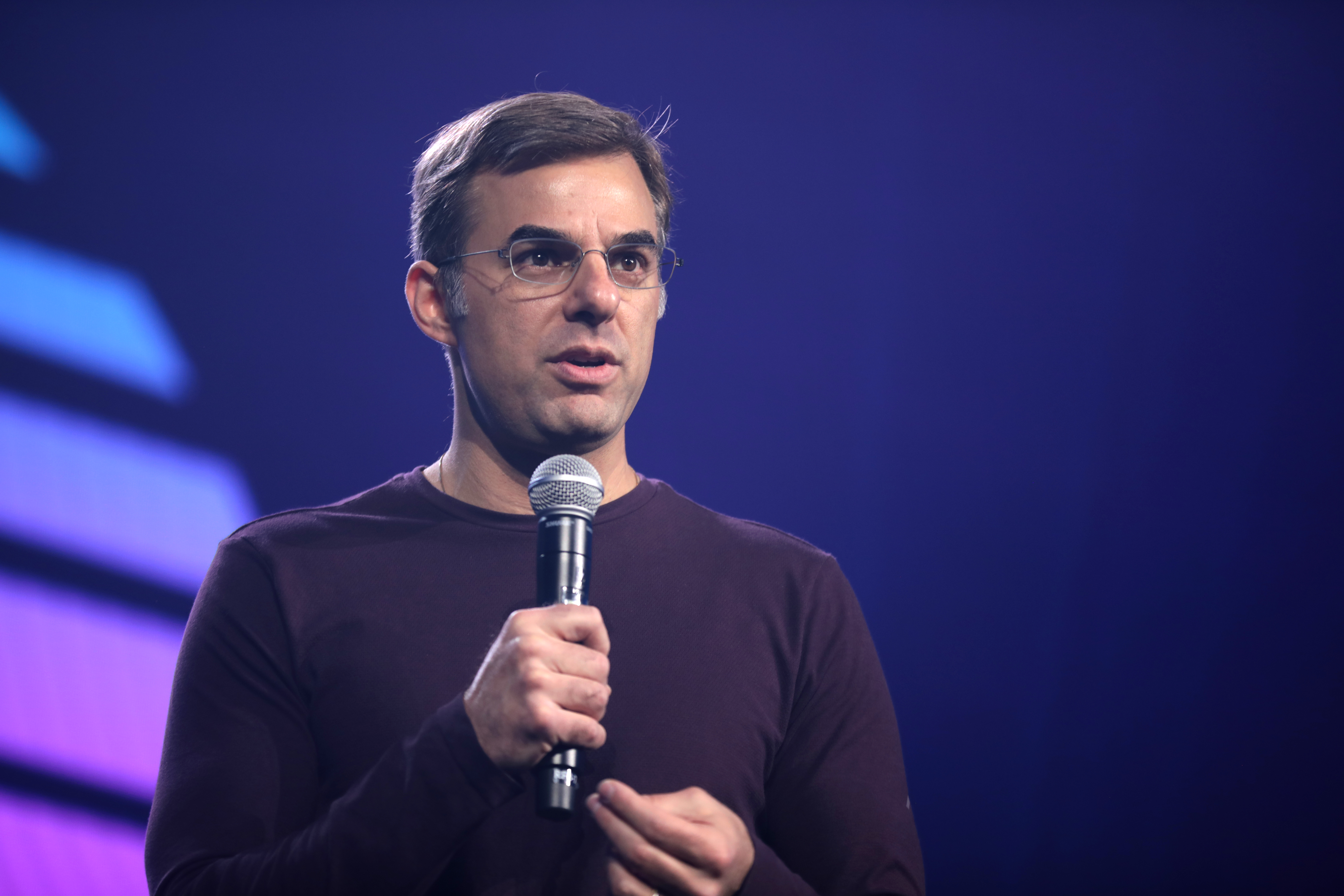
Amash at Revolution 2022 hosted by Young Americans for Liberty

On June 26, 2020, Amash voted against H.R. 51, a D.C. Statehood bill.

==== Death penalty ====
In July 2019, Amash cosponsored Representative Ayanna Pressley's bill that would abolish the death penalty at the federal level.

On February 26, 2020, he was one of four representatives who voted against the Justice for Victims of Lynching Act, which recognized lynching as a federal hate crime, stating that it would expand the use of the death penalty and that the acts criminalized by the bill are already illegal under federal law.

==== Drug policy and police reform ====
Amash has supported efforts to decriminalize cannabis, including the Ending Federal Marijuana Prohibition Act in 2017 (which he cosponsored) and the Marijuana Opportunity Reinvestment and Expungement (MORE) Act in 2020. Both bills sought to legalize cannabis at the federal level by removing it from the Controlled Substances Act.

In 2015, Amash and Representative Ted Lieu (D–CA) introduced a bill to block the Drug Enforcement Administration (DEA) from financing its Cannabis Eradication Program through civil asset forfeiture. Amash took aim at asset forfeiture in a statement, saying the practice allows "innocent people to have their property taken without sufficient due process". In December 2020, Amash introduced a bill titled the Civil Asset Forfeiture Elimination Act to abolish the practice nationwide.

In June 2020, Amash and Pressley introduced the Ending Qualified Immunity Act which would remove from law enforcement officers, and other officials, the protection of qualified immunity that routinely protects them from civil lawsuits.

In March 2010, Amash was the only member of the Michigan House of Representatives to vote against making benzylpiperazine a schedule I drug, saying that penalties for nonviolent crimes shouldn't be increased.

==== Economic ====
Amash opposes government bailouts and tax increases.

In 2011, Amash introduced H.J. Res. 81, a Constitutional amendment proposal that would require a balanced budget over the business cycle with a ten-year transition to balance. That same year, he was one of four House Republicans who joined 161 Democrats to oppose an alternative balanced budget resolution without a federal spending cap.

==== Energy and environment ====
Amash has criticized the Environmental Protection Agency, arguing that many environmental regulations are too strict. He voted for the Energy Tax Prevention Act of 2011, which would have amended the Clean Air Act of 1963 to prohibit the EPA from regulating specified greenhouse gases as air pollutants. In a 2017 debate, Amash "exaggerated uncertainty around the basics of climate science"—specifically, the scientific consensus that carbon emissions cause climate change. But in a 2020 interview, Amash said that climate change is a real and "very important" issue, that he believes climate change is being driven at least in part by human activity and that "action with respect to climate change" should be taken. Amash opposes regulations to combat climate change, arguing that we should instead "use clean technologies and to invent new technologies that will keep our environment clean." He opposed Obama's decision to sign the Paris Agreement to combat climate change, voted against legislation to block Trump's decision to withdraw the United States from the Paris Agreement, and voted for legislation "expressing the sense of Congress that a carbon tax would be detrimental to the United States economy." He opposes government subsidies for nuclear energy or any other form of energy production.

Amash was the only representative from Michigan to oppose federal aid in response to the Flint water crisis, arguing that "the U.S. Constitution does not authorize the federal government to intervene in an intrastate matter like this one." He contended that "the State of Michigan should provide comprehensive assistance to the people of Flint" instead.

==== Gerrymandering ====
Amash opposes political gerrymandering, saying in 2018 that he strongly supported adopting "an independent process for drawing districts" based on geographic considerations, so that districts would be "as compact and contiguous as possible." Amash was the only Republican member of Michigan's congressional delegation who did not join a federal lawsuit challenging the state's political boundaries.

==== Healthcare ====
On May 4, 2017, Amash voted in favor of repealing the Patient Protection and Affordable Care Act (Obamacare) and to pass a revised version of the American Health Care Act. Amash initially opposed the American Health Care Act, describing it as "Swampcare", tweeting that "It didn't take long for the swamp to drain @realDonaldTrump" and criticizing House leadership for attempting to "ram it through." Nevertheless, Amash voted for the updated AHCA plan before the Congressional Budget Office could determine its impact or cost.

==== Political reform ====
Amash has pointed to structural problems in how Congress operates. He believes that many members have put "party above principles," in both the Democratic and Republican parties. He notes that many in Congress lack an understanding of parliamentary procedure, allowing leadership to dictate what legislation is passed. Amash notes that campaign finance poses significant challenges, but states, "I don’t know how to resolve it because I’m a big believer in free speech."

==== Religion ====
In November 2011, he was one of nine representatives who voted against a House resolution that affirmed "In God We Trust" as the official motto of the United States and was the only Republican to do so. On February 13, 2013, he voted against the Federal Disaster Assistance Nonprofit Fairness Act of 2013, which would make all places of religious worship eligible for FEMA grants, stating that bill "skews the law away from fairness by making religious buildings automatically eligible for reconstruction aid when other entities aren’t."

==== Security and surveillance ====
Amash has been a frequent critic of the National Security Agency's surveillance programs.

He voted against the 2011 reauthorization of the USA PATRIOT Act, the 2012 reauthorization of the FISA Amendments Act, and the USA Freedom Act.

In 2013, Amash and 15 other members of Congress filed an amicus brief in Foreign Intelligence Surveillance Court supporting the release of the Court's unpublished opinions regarding the "meaning, scope, and constitutionality" of Section 215 of the Patriot Act. On June 12, 2013, he called for Director of National Intelligence James Clapper to resign for stating at a Senate committee hearing in March that the NSA did not collect data.

In 2013, Amash was one of two Republicans to vote in favor of closing Guantanamo Bay and transferring its detainees. The amendment by Adam Smith would have eliminated all funding for the detention facility by December 31, 2014, removed all limitations on the transfer of detainees, removed a ban on the transfer of detainees to the United States and removed statutes that had banned the use of taxpayer funds for the construction of facilities in the United States for those detainees. It failed on a 174–249 vote.

In 2015, Amash joined John Lewis in signing a letter to the Senate urging them to oppose the USA Freedom Act, which extended surveillance. He recalls: “Here I was, one of the new wave Republicans leading the charge at the time, and I go to John Lewis, an iconic Democrat, asking for help. He says that of course he can help me. His signature was so important in getting other Democrats to look beyond party affiliation and look at the policy—and realize that the policy needed pushback.”

In 2016, Amash was one of three Republicans to vote in favor of an amendment to close Guantánamo Bay and potentially allow federal officials to transfer detainees to facilities in the United States. It failed on a 163–259 vote.

Amash opposed President Donald Trump's 2017 executive order to ban citizens of seven majority-Muslim countries from entering the United States. Amash said: "Like President Obama's executive actions on immigration, President Trump's executive order overreaches and undermines our constitutional system."

Amash proposed an amendment to the reauthorization bill of Section 702 of the Foreign Intelligence Surveillance Act. The Amash amendment would have required the government in criminal cases to seek a warrant based on probable cause before searching surveillance data for information about Americans. While the Amash amendment received bipartisan support as well as support from civil liberties groups including the American Civil Liberties Union, the amendment ultimately failed by a vote of 183 to 233.

==== Suicide prevention hotline ====
In July 2018, Amash was the only member of the U.S. House to vote against creating a three-digit national suicide prevention hotline. He argued that Congress lacked the constitutional power to pass the legislation, saying it was a "good idea" but lacked a "constitutional basis". Freelance journalist Jim Higdon asked Amash how the Constitution prohibits "preventing suicide by hotline"; Amash responded, "The correct question under our Constitution is: What is the authority for the legislation? We live under a Constitution that grants Congress limited, enumerated powers."

==== LGBT rights ====
While running for the House of Representatives in 2010, Amash supported the Defense of Marriage Act, but in 2013 he advocated repealing it, saying that the "real threat to traditional marriage & religious liberty is government, not gay couples who love each other & want to spend lives together". He supported the result of Obergefell v. Hodges (in which the Supreme Court held that same-sex couples cannot be deprived of the fundamental right to marry) on the grounds that government-issued marriage licenses should not be "necessary to validate the intimate relationships of consenting adults."

In 2015, Amash was among 60 Republicans voting to uphold President Barack Obama's 2014 executive order banning federal contractors from making hiring decisions that discriminate based on sexual orientation or gender identity.

In 2016, Amash was among 43 Republicans to vote for the Maloney Amendment to H.R. 5055 which would prohibit the use of funds for government contractors who discriminate against LGBT employees.

In 2017, Amash was one of two dozen Republicans to vote against an amendment to the National Defense Authorization Act that would have prohibited taxpayer funds from being used by the Department of Defense to provide gender transition support to military members. He said, "Those who serve in our Armed Forces deserve the best medical care...With respect to transgender persons, we should focus on the best science, not the political or philosophical opinions of partisans."

In 2019, Amash voted "present" on a resolution objecting to Trump's restrictions on transgender individuals in the military.

In May 2020, Amash stated that if elected president, he would support and protect transgender Americans, saying, "I think that people can take the term 'sex' that's in federal law and interpret it to mean things beyond what it traditionally meant...I would protect transgender Americans under the protections that exist for sex."

=== Foreign ===
==== Diplomacy ====
In May 2020, Amash expressed support for U.S. membership in the United Nations as a "positive venue" for diplomatic engagement.

==== Immigration ====
At a January 2013 town hall event, Amash responded to a question about immigration reform, "I don't think you can just grab people and deport them...I think we need to have a system that is sympathetic to people, looks at their situations and allows as many people to stay here as possible." On March 21, 2013, he and five other representatives signed a letter to U.S. Senator Rand Paul supporting immigration reform in the form of a "three-pronged stool" of border security, expanding legal immigration and "addressing" immigrants who came here "knowingly and illegally". In August he explained his support for immigration reform, saying improving the legal immigration system to make it more accessible would lead to fewer illegal border crossings. He announced his support for a path to legal status for the estimated 11 million undocumented immigrants in the U.S. He also supported an eventual path to citizenship once the undocumented obtained legal status.

In July 2017, Amash was the only Republican to vote against Kate's law, a bill that increased maximum penalties for criminals who entered the U.S. illegally more than once. He later said he was concerned the bill did not have adequate 5th amendment due process protections for undocumented immigrants to challenge their removal orders.

In July 2018, House Republicans introduced a resolution supporting the officers and personnel of Immigration and Customs Enforcement (ICE). Amash was the only Republican in the chamber to vote against the resolution. He tweeted, "The House voted today on an inane resolution regarding ICE. The resolution makes several dubious claims and denounces calls to abolish ICE. I wouldn't abolish ICE without an alternative, but there's no reason to treat a federal agency as though it's beyond reproach and reform."

In December 2018, Amash was one of eight House Republicans to vote against a stopgap government funding bill that included $5.7 billion in border wall funding. He tweeted, "This massive, wasteful spending bill—stuffed with unrelated items—passed 217–185. It's amazing how some wall funding causes my fellow Republicans to embrace big government."

In February 2019, Amash was the only House Republican to co-sponsor a resolution to block Trump's declaration of a national emergency to redirect funds to build a wall on the U.S.-Mexico border without a congressional appropriation for such a project. He wrote, "A national emergency declaration for a non-emergency is void", and "[Trump] is attempting to circumvent our constitutional system." On February 25, Amash was one of 13 House Republicans to vote to block Trump's declaration.

==== Military ====
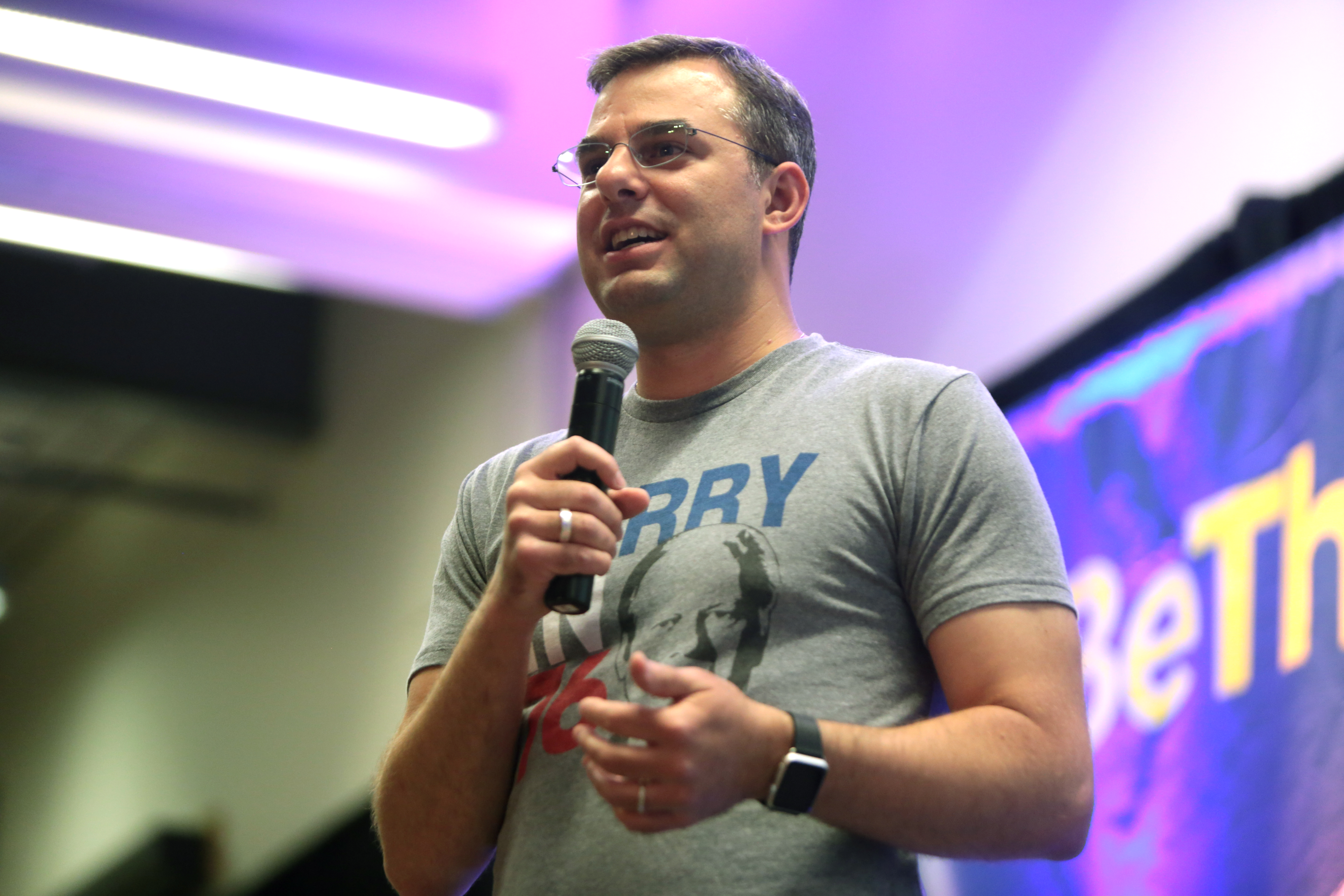
Amash speaking at the 2016 Young Americans for Liberty National Convention in Washington, DC

Amash supports decreasing U.S. military spending and believes there is significant waste in the U.S. Department of Defense.

He believes only Congress has the power to declare war, and has criticized multiple military actions taken by Presidents Obama and Trump. In July 2011, he sponsored an amendment to the Department of Defense Appropriations Act that would have prevented funding for operations against Gaddafi's government and Amash later stated that President Obama's actions during the Libyan Civil War were unconstitutional without authorization from Congress. He criticized President Obama's intervention in Syria against the Islamic State of Iraq and the Levant for proceeding without a Congressional declaration of war.

In 2011, Amash was one of six members of Congress who voted against House Resolution 268 reaffirming U.S. commitment to a negotiated settlement of the Israeli–Palestinian conflict through direct Israeli–Palestinian negotiation, which passed with 407 members in support. In 2014 he was one of eight members of Congress who voted against a $225 million package to restock Israel's Iron Dome missile defenses, which passed with 398 members in support. He supports a two-state solution to the Israeli–Palestinian conflict.

Amash joined 104 Democrats and 16 Republicans in voting against the 2012 National Defense Authorization Act (NDAA), which specified the budget and expenditures of the Department of Defense, calling it "one of the most anti-liberty pieces of legislation of our lifetime". Amash co-sponsored an amendment to the NDAA that would ban indefinite military detention and military trials so that all terror suspects arrested in the United States would be tried in civilian courts. He expressed concern that individuals charged with terrorism could be jailed for prolonged periods of time without ever being formally charged or brought to trial.

On March 14, 2016, Amash joined the unanimous vote in the House to approve a resolution declaring the Islamic State of Iraq and the Levant (ISIL) to be committing genocide against religious minorities in the Middle East (it passed 383–0), but joined Representatives Tulsi Gabbard (D-HI) and Thomas Massie (R-KY) in voting against a separate measure creating an international tribunal to try those accused of participating in the alleged atrocities (it passed 392–3).

In 2017, Amash criticized U.S. involvement in Saudi Arabian-led intervention in Yemen, arguing that "Al Qaeda in Yemen has emerged as a de facto ally of the Saudi-led militaries with whom [Trump] administration aims to partner more closely."

In July 2017, Amash was one of only three House members to vote against the Countering America's Adversaries Through Sanctions Act, a bill that imposed new economic sanctions against Russia, Iran, and North Korea. The bill passed the House on a 419–3 vote, with Representatives Thomas Massie (R-KY) and John Duncan Jr. (R-TN) also voting no. Trump initially opposed the bill, saying that relations with Russia were already "at an all-time and dangerous low", but ultimately signed it.

In January 2019, Amash voted against legislation that would prevent the President from unilaterally withdrawing from or altering NATO, although he subsequently said that he supports U.S. NATO membership, pointing to his 2017 vote to affirm NATO's Article 5.

In 2019, Amash signed a letter led by Representative Ro Khanna and Senator Rand Paul to Trump arguing that it is "long past time to rein in the use of force that goes beyond congressional authorization" and that they hoped this would "serve as a model for ending hostilities in the future – in particular, as you and your administration seek a political solution to our involvement in Afghanistan."

In October 2019, Amash criticized Trump's proposed withdrawal of U.S. troops from Syria for having "green-lighted" the 2019 Turkish offensive into northeastern Syria against Kurdish forces.

In January 2020, Amash voted in favor of the "No War Against Iran Act", which sought to block funding for the use of US military force in or against Iran unless Congress preemptively signed off. This proposed act is more restrictive than the 1973 War Powers Act, which requires the president to notify Congress within 48 hours of committing armed forces to military action and forbids armed forces from remaining for more than 60 days without congressional authorization. It passed the U.S. House of Representatives on a 228–175 vote. Amash also voted to repeal the 2002 authorization for use of military force (AUMF), which passed the U.S. House on a 236–166 vote.

=== Criticism of Donald Trump ===
In 2016, Amash joined the list of Republicans who opposed the Republican presidential nominee, Donald Trump. After Trump was elected president, the Huffington Post profiled him in an article titled "The One House Republican Who Can't Stop Criticizing Donald Trump". In that article Amash said, "I'm not here to represent a particular political party; I'm here to represent all of my constituents and to follow the Constitution."

After Representative John Lewis (D-GA) said that Trump was not a "legitimate president," Trump sent out a series of tweets on January 14, 2017, criticizing Lewis. Amash responded to Trump's tweets with one of his own: "Dude, just stop." Amash later explained, "The reason I did it is he wouldn't stop ... The way he feels so slighted about everything I think is not healthy for our country." Amash felt that Lewis' comments were "inappropriate" but said that Trump's response should have been "dignified and conciliatory to the extent possible" instead of "personal jabs, attacking his district".

In April 2017, Dan Scavino, a senior Trump White House aide, called for Amash to be defeated in a Republican primary challenge. Amash later called Trump a "childish bully."

In May 2017, Trump was accused of pressuring fired FBI director James Comey to end an investigation into former national security adviser Michael Flynn. Amash and Carlos Curbelo were the first Republican members of Congress to publicly state that the allegations, if proven true, merited impeachment.

In June 2018, the Huffington Post asked House Republicans, "If the president pardoned himself, would they support impeachment?" Amash was the only Republican who said "definitively he would support impeachment". In July 2018, Amash strongly criticized Trump's conduct at a meeting in Helsinki with Russian president Vladimir Putin, writing: "The impression it left on me, a strong supporter of the meeting, is that 'something is not right here.' The president went out of his way to appear subordinate. He spoke more like the head of a vassal state."

When Trump's former attorney Michael Cohen testified before the House Oversight Committee on February 27, 2019, Amash asked him, "What is the truth President Trump is most afraid of people knowing?" The Hill columnist Krystal Ball wrote, "Amash showed how someone actually can exercise oversight responsibility and try to get to the truth, even if the truth might not be in his party's short-term best interest." CNN editor Chris Cillizza wrote, "The Michigan Republican did something on Wednesday that almost none of his GOP colleagues seemed willing to even try: Ask Cohen questions about his relationship with Trump that might actually shed some new light on not only their relationship but on the President of the United States."

==== Comments on the Mueller Report ====
In May 2019, Amash said that Trump "has engaged in impeachable conduct" based on the obstruction of justice findings of the Mueller Report, which, Amash said, "few members of Congress have read". Amash also said that Attorney General William Barr "deliberately misrepresented" the report's findings and that partisanship was making it difficult to maintain checks and balances in the American political system. Amash was the first Republican member of Congress to call for Trump's impeachment. In response, Trump called Amash a "loser", accused him of "getting his name out there through controversy", and stated that the Mueller report had concluded that there was no obstruction of justice. Ronna McDaniel, chairwoman of the Republican National Committee, accused Amash of "parroting the Democrats' talking points on Russia." She did not explicitly express support for a primary challenge against Amash, but tweeted, "voters in Amash's district strongly support this president." House Minority Leader Kevin McCarthy, a Republican, claimed that Amash "votes more with Nancy Pelosi than he ever does with me"; PolitiFact evaluated this as false. Republican Senator Mitt Romney described Amash's statement as "courageous", though he disagreed with Amash's conclusions. The New York Times reported that while many Republicans supported Trump in public, they criticized his actions in private. Shortly after making his remarks on impeachment, Amash received a standing ovation from the majority of attendees at a town hall meeting in his district. He told the crowd that Trump was setting a bad example for the nation's children.

Two days after Amash's comments, state representative James Lower announced that he would challenge Amash in the 2020 Republican primary, running as a self-described "pro-Trump conservative." Army National Guard member Thomas Norton announced his candidacy in April. Three other Republicans sought the nomination to oppose Amash; Peter Meijer ultimately won the August 4 primary as Amash opted to not stand for re-election.

==== Trump impeachment ====
On October 31, 2019, Amash was the only non-Democrat in the House to vote for an impeachment inquiry against Trump in connection with the Trump-Ukraine scandal. On December 18, 2019, he voted in favor of both articles of impeachment proceedings against Trump, the only non-Democrat to vote in favor of either article. When Mitt Romney was the only Republican senator who voted to convict Trump in his Senate trial, Amash tweeted, "Thank you, @SenatorRomney, for upholding your oath to support and defend the Constitution. You will never regret putting your faith in God and doing right according to the law and your conscience."

== Personal life ==
Amash and his wife Kara (née Day) married after graduating from college, having previously met at the high school they attended together. They have a son and two daughters. Amash is an Antiochian Orthodox Christian.

Several of Amash's relatives were killed by an Israeli airstrike while sheltering in a church on October 19, 2023, during the Gaza war.

== Electoral history ==
2008 Michigan 72nd State House District Republican primary
Party	Candidate	Votes	%
Republican	Justin Amash	4,733	41.4%
Republican	Ken Yonker	4,010	35.1%
Republican	Linda Steil	2,170	19.0%
Republican	David Elias	320	2.8%
Republican	Timothy Cyrus	199	1.7%
Total votes		11,432	100.0%

2008 Michigan 72nd State House District election
Party	Candidate	Votes	%	±%
Republican	Justin Amash	31,245	61.0%	−4.7%
Democratic	Albert S. Abbasse	18,463	36.0%	+4.3%
Libertarian	William Wenzel III	1,559	3.0%	+1.6%
Total votes		51,267	100.0%	

2010 Michigan 3rd Congressional District Republican primary
Party	Candidate	Votes	%
Republican	Justin Amash (incumbent)	38,569	40.4%
Republican	Steve Heacock	25,157	26.3%
Republican	Bill Hardiman	22,715	23.7%
Republican	Bob Overbeek	5,133	5.4%
Republican	Louise E. Johnson	4,020	4.2%
Total votes		95,594	100.0%

2010 Michigan 3rd Congressional District election
Party	Candidate	Votes	%	±%
Republican	Justin Amash (incumbent)	133,714	59.7%	−1.4%
Democratic	Patrick Miles Jr.	83,953	37.5%	+2.1%
Libertarian	James Rogers	2,677	1.2%	−2.3%
Constitution	Theodore Gerrard	2,144	1.0%	+1.0%
Green	Charlie Shick	1,575	0.7%	+0.7%
Total votes		224,063	100.0%	

2012 Michigan 3rd Congressional District election
Party	Candidate	Votes	%	±%
Republican	Justin Amash (incumbent)	171,675	52.6%	−7.1%
Democratic	Steve Pestka	144,108	44.2%	+6.7%
Libertarian	William J. Gelineau	10,498	3.2%	+2.0%
Independent	Steven Butler (write-in)	2	0.0%	+0.0%
Total votes		326,283	100.0%	

2014 Michigan 3rd Congressional District Republican primary
Party	Candidate	Votes	%
Republican	Justin Amash (incumbent)	39,706	59.7%
Republican	Brian Ellis	33,953	42.6%
Total votes		69,128	100.0%

2014 Michigan 3rd Congressional District election
Party	Candidate	Votes	%	±%
Republican	Justin Amash (incumbent)	125,754	57.9%	+5.3%
Democratic	Bob Goodrich	84,720	39.0%	−5.2%
Green	Tonya Duncan	6,691	3.1%	+3.1%
Total votes		217,165	100.0%	

2016 Michigan 3rd Congressional District Republican primary
Party	Candidate	Votes	%
Republican	Justin Amash (incumbent)	55,889	100.0%
Total votes		55,889	100.0%

2016 Michigan 3rd Congressional District election
Party	Candidate	Votes	%	±%
Republican	Justin Amash (incumbent)	203,545	59.5%	+1.5%
Democratic	Douglas Smith	128,400	37.5%	−1.5%
Constitution	Theodore Gerrard	10,420	3.0%	+3.0%
Total votes		342,365	100.0%	

2018 Michigan 3rd Congressional District Republican primary
Party	Candidate	Votes	%
Republican	Justin Amash (incumbent)	69,817	99.9%
Republican	Joe Farrington (write-in)	52	0.1%
Total votes		69,869	100.0%

2018 Michigan 3rd Congressional District election
Party	Candidate	Votes	%	±%
Republican	Justin Amash (incumbent)	169,107	54.4%	−5.0%
Democratic	Cathy Albro	134,185	43.2%	+5.7%
Constitution	Theodore Gerrard	7,445	2.4%	−0.6%
Independent	Joe Farrington (write-in)	3	0.0%	+0.0%
Total votes		310,740	100.0%	

2024 United States Senate election in Michigan Republican primary results
Party	Candidate	Votes	%
Republican	Mike Rogers	553,083	63.2%
Republican	Justin Amash	137,004	15.7%
Republican	Sherry O'Donnell	105,979	12.1%
Republican	Sandy Pensler (withdrawn)	79,302	9.1%
Total votes		875,368	100.0%

== See also ==
- List of Arab and Middle-Eastern Americans in the United States Congress
- List of American politicians who switched parties in office
- List of United States representatives who switched parties

== Notes ==
U.S. House of Representatives
Preceded by Vern Ehlers	Member of the U.S. House of Representatives from Michigan's 3rd congressional district 2011–2021	Succeeded by Peter Meijer
U.S. order of precedence (ceremonial)
Preceded by James A. Barcia as Former U.S. Representative	Order of precedence of the United States as Former U.S. Representative	Succeeded by Skip Bafalis as Former U.S. Representative
