= Nehantic State Forest =

Forest in Connecticut, United States

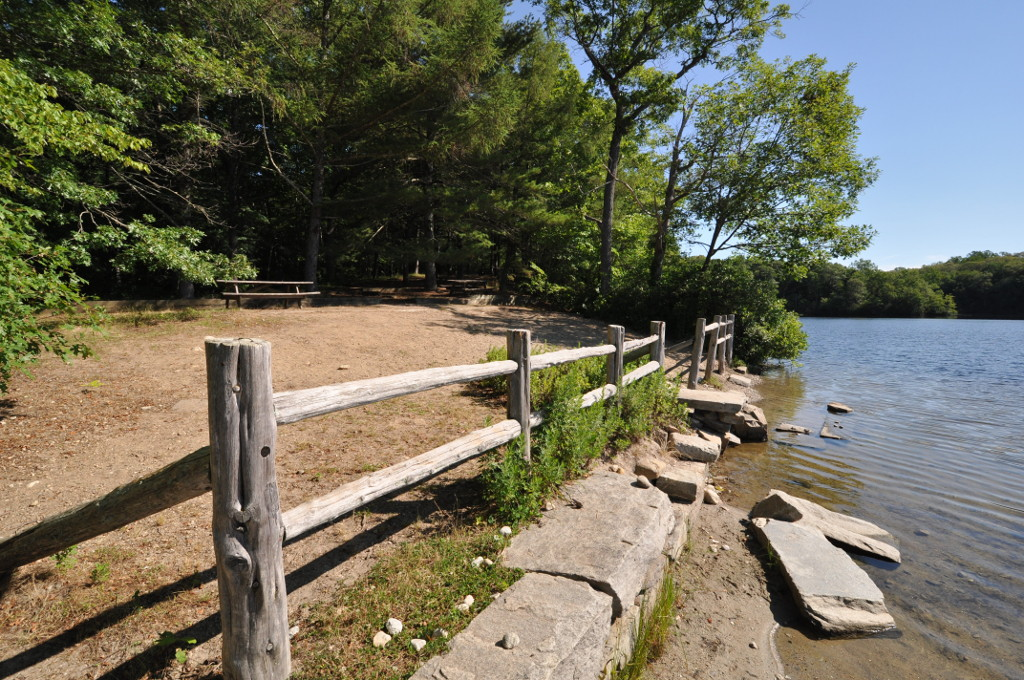
- Picnic area at Uncas Pond

- Location within Connecticut Location within the United States
- Location: Lyme, East Lyme, and Salem, Connecticut, United States
- Coordinates: 41°25′09″N 72°15′39″W
- Area: 4,937 acres (1,998 ha)
- Elevation: 285 ft (87 m)
- Established: 1926
- Administrator: Connecticut Department of Energy and Environmental Protection
- Website: Official website

Nehantic State Forest is a publicly owned forest and recreation area occupying two parcels, one in the town of Lyme and one in the towns of East Lyme and Salem, in the state of Connecticut. The forest, which totals 4,937 acres (1,998 ha), is the site of regular prescribed burns and timber-harvesting operations. Purchase of the land began in 1926, when it became the first state forest located in New London County. It is managed by the Connecticut Department of Energy and Environmental Protection.

== Activities and amenities ==
The forest offers opportunities for hiking, hunting, picnicking, swimming and boating. The Lyme portion of the forest provides access to the 69-acre (28 ha) Uncas Pond and the 30-acre (12 ha) Norwich Pond. Boat launches are located on each pond. The ponds and their connecting stream, Falls Brook, sit at the western edge of Becket Hill State Park Reserve. No roads or trails pass from the state forest into the undeveloped and otherwise inaccessible 260-acre (110 ha) state park reserve though dirt park roads and the Blue-Blazed Nayantaquit Trail hiking trail system make much of the Lyme section (Western Block) of Nehantic State Forest easily accessible to the public.
