= John Ely (surgeon) =

Connecticut Colonel

John Ely (September 24, 1737 – October 3, 1800) was a Connecticut surgeon and Colonel in the American Revolution.

== Early life ==
Born in Lyme, Connecticut, John Ely became a physician and surgeon with a reputation that reached far beyond the Saybrook (Note: Following the Revolution, the town of Saybrook divided into several smaller towns. Ely lived and died in what is now known as Westbrook. In some of the cited documents the town is occasionally erroneously referred to as Westport.) He specialized in the treatment of smallpox. He bought Duck Island off the Saybrook shore (now a major Egret rookery) and then built a hospital for his smallpox patients. When this disease broke out in the Army of General George Washington in July 1776, Dr. Ely was sent for and did much to arrest the plague.

== Revolutionary War ==
Colonel Ely is remembered as a soldier of the American Revolution and as a patriot who gave not only his skill as physician and military commander to the cause, but his fortune and his health.

He was a Captain of the Sixth Connecticut from May 1 to December 18, 1775; Colonel of a Connecticut militia regiment in 1777; he was taken prisoner in the Long Island Expedition of December 10, 1777; and exchanged on December 5, 1780.

In 1775 John Ely purchased Duck Island from John Williams. He obtained permission to operate a hospital was granted annually by the selectmen of Old Saybrook. By 1780 the brothers had parted, and Doctor Elisha Ely secured permission to open.

The British burned Ely's hospital during the Revolutionary War.

In 1775 Ely, after the news of the battle of Lexington came to Westport, mustered a company of militia as Captain and marched with it to Roxbury, now part of Boston. The next year as Major he performed a tour of duty as commandant at Fort Trumbull, New London, also serving there as physician and one day he sent a "pithy" letter to the Captain of a vessel at the mouth of the harbor suspected of being English which promptly sailed away.

In 1776, he was ordered by Connecticut to tend to the medical needs of soldiers.

Major Ely was a man of wealth, mostly invested in farms. One of these in 1777 he sold and used most of the proceeds in raising a regiment of which he was commissioned Colonel. To many of his men he furnished arms, uniforms, and other supplies at his own expense.

He marched his regiment to New London and was again appointed commandant of the Fort.

After he became a prisoner, his son Capt. Worthington Ely organized a small force to capture a British officer to exchange for his father. In this he was successful. But due to the entreaties of the other officer prisoners, Dr. Ely agreed to remain a prisoner to care for his fellow officers. Sometime after this, when he became eligible for exchange, a group of former prisoner officers under the leadership of Col. Matthews (later a member of Congress and Governor of Georgia) and Col. Ramsay of the Maryland line, urged him to continue caring for his fellow prisoners. Thus Dr. Ely remained a prisoner for three years, until finally released on 25 December 1780. Ely was one of the most famous doctors of his era, particularly for treating soldiers who were afflicted by Smallpox. After he was captured by the British, he refused to be exchanged, because he did not want to leave his patients.

He was released as part of a prisoner exchange on December 5, 1780.

== Post Revolution ==
After the war, Col. Ely applied to Congress for recompense for his services and for the money he had devoted to the revolution. General Henry Knox, Secretary of War, supported this and President Washington wrote the Colonel promising a successful outcome for his petition. The House adopted a bill to grant him $20,000.00. But U.S. Senator Oliver Ellsworth opposed money grants and successfully fought the Ely measure in the Senate. Some forty years later his heirs presented a claim to Congress, which was approved, but as most of the papers in the case had been lost, only $5,000.00 of back pay was allowed.

Ely wrote repeatedly to George Washington seeking his assistance.

After his release from Long Island, he returned to Westbrook where he resumed his medical practice.

Ely died in Westbrook, CT on October 3, 1800, aged 63. He is buried in the Old Burying Ground in Westbrook next to the gravestone of his father-in-law, the Rev. William Worthington. His entreaties to Washington were fruitless during his lifetime, and he died impoverished.

Among his friends he numbered Washington, Lafayette, and Rochambeau. Mrs. Ely was able to speak in their native tongue to the French officers she entertained. Washington wrote the Colonel affectionate letters acknowledging his "incomparable services." He was invited to dinner by General Benedict Arnold, before the latter betrayed his country: "General Arnold's compliments wait on Col. Ely. He asks the favor of his company to dine with him at his house today at 2 o'clock."

== Notable descendants ==
John Ely's grandson Samuel Griswold Goodrich, also known as Peter Parley, was a noted author and diplomat whose book Recollections of a Lifetime was the source for the information herein not otherwise cited. Samuel's daughter, Emily Goodrich Smith, was a newspaper correspondent.
