= Hiel Brockway =

American businessman (1775–1842)

Hiel Brockway (16 April 1775 – 19 August 1842) was a native of Lyme, Connecticut, and came to Clarkson, New York, shortly after the War of 1812. Upon arrival, he built and operated a tavern. He was a town builder and the first resident of Brockport, New York, which now bears his name. Seizing the opportunity offered by the Erie Canal, he speculated the land by building many of the first houses. Brockway owned a brickyard which produced most of the material for their construction. He also owned a shipyard and later operated a packet service on the canal.

Brockway and Seymour, both civic and business-minded, donated land for the construction of schools and churches. Brockway contributed the land for the original campus. Brockway fathered thirteen children and resided in Brockport until his death in 1842.
