= Michigan's 72nd House of Representatives district =

American legislative district

Michigan's 72nd State House of Representatives district
Representative
Mike Mueller; R–Linden
- Demographics: 85.2% White; 4.3% Black; 3.5% Hispanic; 1.9% Asian; 0.1% Native American; 0.8% Other; 4.3% Multiracial
- Population (2024): 92,221

Michigan's 72nd House of Representatives district (also referred to as Michigan's 72nd House district) is a legislative district within the Michigan House of Representatives located in parts of Genesee, Livingston and Oakland counties. The district was created in 1965, when the Michigan House of Representatives district naming scheme changed from a county-based system to a numerical one.

== List of representatives ==
Representative	Party	Dates	Residence	Notes
Warren N. Goemaere	Democratic	1965–1978	Roseville	
Nick Ciaramitaro	Democratic	1979–1982	Roseville	
David H. Evans	Democratic	1983–1984	Mount Clemens	
Robert A. Perakis	Republican	1985–1986	Mount Clemens	
Sharon L. Gire	Democratic	1987–1992	Clinton Township	
Walter J. DeLange	Republican	1993–1996	Kentwood	
Mark Jansen	Republican	1997–2002	Grand Rapids	
Glenn D. Steil Jr.	Republican	2003–2008	Cascade Township	Lived in Grand Rapids until around 2007.
Justin Amash	Republican	2009–2010	Cascade Township	
Ken Yonker	Republican	2011–2016	Caledonia	Lived in Gaines Township from 2013 to 2014.
Steve Johnson	Republican	2017–2022	Shelbyville	
Mike Mueller	Republican	2023–present	Linden	

== Recent elections ==
=== 2020s ===
2026 Michigan House of Representatives election
Party	Candidate	Votes	%
Republican	Mike Mueller (incumbent)	26,488	54.61
Democratic	Thomas Ryan	22,013	45.39
Total votes		48,501	100
Republican hold			

2024 Michigan House of Representatives election
Party	Candidate	Votes	%
Republican	Mike Mueller	34,910	60.8
Democratic	John Dolza	22,512	39.2
Total votes		57,422	100
Republican hold			

2022 Michigan House of Representatives election
Party	Candidate	Votes	%
Republican	Mike Mueller	26,452	58.1
Democratic	Stacy Taylor	19,084	41.9
Total votes		45,538	100
Republican hold			

2020 Michigan House of Representatives election
Party	Candidate	Votes	%
Republican	Steve Johnson	29,614	55.1
Democratic	Lily Chen-Schulting	24,170	44.9
Total votes		53,784	100
Republican hold			

2018 Michigan House of Representatives election
Party	Candidate	Votes	%
Republican	Steve Johnson	21,374	53.7
Democratic	Ron Draayer	17,273	43.4
Libertarian	Jamie Lewis	1,185	3.0
Total votes		39,832	100
Republican hold			

2016 Michigan House of Representatives election
Party	Candidate	Votes	%
Republican	Steve Johnson	26,343	58.5
Democratic	Steve Shoemaker	18,693	41.5
Total votes		45,036	100
Republican hold			

2014 Michigan House of Representatives election
Party	Candidate	Votes	%
Republican	Ken Yonker	17,884	68.2
Democratic	Kemal Hamulic	8,329	31.8
Total votes		26,213	100
Republican hold			

2012 Michigan House of Representatives election
Party	Candidate	Votes	%
Republican	Ken Yonker	24,653	58.5
Democratic	Scott Urbanowski	15,982	38.0
Libertarian	William Wenzel	1,481	3.5
Total votes		42,116	100
Republican hold			

2010 Michigan House of Representatives election
Party	Candidate	Votes	%
Republican	Ken Yonker	24,800	72.9
Democratic	Brian Bosak	9,219	27.1
Total votes		34,019	100
Republican hold			

2008 Michigan House of Representatives election
Party	Candidate	Votes	%
Republican	Justin Amash	31,238	61.0
Democratic	Albert Abbasse	18,454	36.0
Libertarian	William Wenzel	1,558	3.0
Total votes		51,250	100
Republican hold			

== Historical district boundaries ==
Map	Description	Apportionment Plan	Notes
	Macomb County (part): Clinton Township (part); Fraser; Roseville; St. Clair Shores (part); Warren (part)	1964 Apportionment Plan	
	Macomb County (part): Clinton Township (part); Fraser; Roseville	1972 Apportionment Plan	
	Macomb County (part): Clinton Township; Fraser	1982 Apportionment Plan	
	Kent County (part): Byron Township; Caledonia Township; Cascade Township; Gaines Township; Kentwood	1992 Apportionment Plan	
	Kent County (part): Caledonia Township; Cascade Township; Gaines Township; Kentwood	2001 Apportionment Plan	
	Allegan County (part): Dorr Township; Leighton Township; Wayland; Wayland Township; Kent County (part): Gaines Township; Kentwood	2011 Apportionment Plan	
