= Selden Neck State Park =

State park in New London County, Connecticut

- Location within Connecticut Location within the United States
- Location: Lyme, Connecticut, United States
- Coordinates: 41°23′46″N 72°24′34″W
- Area: 607 acres (246 ha)
- Elevation: 217 ft (66 m)
- Established: 1917
- Administrator: Connecticut Department of Energy and Environmental Protection
- Designation: Connecticut state park
- Website: Official website
- Selden Island Site
- U.S. National Register of Historic Places
- Part of: Lower Connecticut River Valley Woodland Period Archaeological TR
- NRHP reference No.: 87001231
- Added to NRHP: October 15, 1987

Selden Neck State Park is a 607-acre (246 ha) island and public recreation area on the Connecticut River in the town of Lyme, Connecticut. Accessible only by boat, the state park has four areas for primitive, riverside camping. Hiking, fishing, and hunting are also available. The park was among the first parcels secured for park purposes by the state, with initial land purchases on the island made in 1917. It is managed by Connecticut Department of Energy and Environmental Protection.

== Setting ==
Selden Neck State Park is located on Selden Island, and is not actually a neck or peninsula. It is located on the east side of the Connecticut River south of Gillette Castle State Park, and is separated from the mainland by Selden Creek, land owned by the Nature Conservancy. The roughly lozenge-shaped island is about 0.5 miles (0.80 km) at its widest point and about 1.5 miles (2.4 km) long. It is primarily wooded except for a fringe of tidal marshes, and has a high point of 230 feet (70 m).

== Features ==
The island is entirely roadless, but there are hiking trails on it. The main campground is located on the river side near the northern end. The island also has the remains of a quarry, located near the southeastern end. Begun in the late 19th century, the quarry provided red sandstone pavers for New York City and other regional cities. In addition to the quarry itself, the remains of a causeway for bringing stone from the quarry to the shore also survive.

The island also has a documented prehistory. Excavations on the island in the 1980s uncovered a sizable Middle Woodland Period village, with radiocarbon dates to c. 1000 CE. Stone tools, pottery fragments, and animal bones are among the many artifacts found in the excavation, which only covered an estimated 2% of the site, which was listed on the National Register of Historic Places in 1987.
