= Cooper Site (Lyme, Connecticut) =

Archaeological site in Connecticut, United States

- U.S. National Register of Historic Places
- Nearest city: Lyme, Connecticut
- Area: 0.6 acres (0.24 ha)
- MPS: Lower Connecticut River Valley Woodland Period Archaeological TR
- NRHP reference No.: 87001224
- Added to NRHP: October 15, 1987

The Cooper Site is an archaeological site in Lyme, Connecticut. On a terrace of the Connecticut River near Hamburg Cove, the site has yielded evidence of Middle to Late Woodland occupation. The Late Woodland component includes evidence interpreted as the site of a wigwam, with a large number of stone chips consistent with the development of stone tools at the site. The Middle Woodland component is interpreted as a series of small camps whose occupation was relatively brief. Finds at the site have been dated as far back as c. 500 CE, and include narrow-stemmed projectile points, most of which were made from local quartz, but also from more distant chert and hornfels, some which is from quarries as far off as New Jersey. Pottery finds include fragments with dentate stamping.

The site was listed on the National Register of Historic Places in 1987. It is located about 100 yards (91 m) north of the Hamburg Cove Site, a much larger settlement site.

== See also ==
- National Register of Historic Places listings in New London County, Connecticut
