= Stephen Johnson (minister) =

American minister and pamphleteer

- Born: May 17, 1724; Newark, New Jersey, United States
- Died: November 8, 1786 (aged 62)
- Education: Yale College (graduated 1743)
- Occupations: Minister and pamphleteer
- Writing career
- Subjects: Stamp Act, Christian theology
- Notable work: Some Important Observations (1765–66)

Stephen Johnson (May 17, 1724 – November 8, 1786) was a Congregationalist minister and pamphleteer from Lyme, Connecticut who wrote one of the first pamphlets condemning the Stamp Act.

== Life ==
Johnson was born in Newark, New Jersey in 1724 to Sarah, née Ogden, and Nathaniel Johnson. Through his mother, he was the great-grandson of John Ogden, who founded Elizabethtown, New Jersey. Johnson married Elizabeth Diodati, the daughter of a New Haven merchant, on July 26, 1744.

Johnson graduated from Yale College in 1743 (he would later serve as a member of the Yale Corporation) and became minister of the First Congregational Church of Lyme, CT (now Old Lyme) in 1746, succeeding Jonathan Parsons. He subscribed to New Divinity theology.

Johnson was attached as chaplain to a regiment in the Revolutionary War. He left for battle in May 1775, likely as part of the 6th Connecticut Regiment commanded by Samuel Holden Parsons, and was present at the Battle of Bunker Hill.

He is buried at Duck River Cemetery.

== Writing ==
Johnson wrote his pamphlet, one of the first against the Stamp Act, in 1765, during his 20th year as minister of Lyme's First Congregational Church. Titled Some Important Observations, Occasioned by and Adapted to the Publick Fast, Ordered by Authority, it was delivered as a sermon on December 18, 1765. In an oft-quoted passage, George Bancroft describes it as "a paper from the incomparable Stephen Johnson, of Lyme".

Johnson's work is a "fiery article, designed to rouse the community to a sense of the public danger" from the Stamp Act. Its substantive content was printed in two versions: once serially in a New London newspaper, and then in pamphlet form by a printer in Newport, Rhode Island. Although the two versions make similar arguments, the newspaper version is cast in secular terms, whereas the pamphlet is styled as a sermon. The newspaper version was published pseudonymously, like many 18th-century polemics, under the name of "Addison".

Johnson's neighbor John McCurdy financed the dissemination of Johnson's works. The two were close, and often discussed their various grievances with the administration of Governor Thomas Fitch.

His two other known other works include an election day sermon preached on May 10, 1770, (Note: The election day sermon—as its name suggests, a sermon preached on Election Day—was a tradition in New England from very early in the colonial period to the 19th century. See Ferguson, Robert A. (1997). The American Enlightenment, 1750–1820. Cambridge, Massachusetts: Harvard University Press. p. 66. ISBN 978-0-674-02322-2.) and a massive anti-Unitarian treatise.

== Sources ==
- Sill, Edward Everett (1901). A Forgotten Connecticut Patriot. New Haven, Connecticut: Connecticut Society of the Order of the Founders and Patriots of America.
- Bailyn, Bernard (1992). "Stephen Johnson". Faces of Revolution: Personalities and Themes in the Struggle for American Independence. New York: Vintage Books. pp. 137–149. ISBN 0-679-73623-9. OCLC 25747591.
- Lamb, Martha Joanna; Harrison, Constance Cary (1896). History of the City of New York. New York: Alfred Smith Barnes.
- Lampos, Jim; Pearson, Michaelle (2016). Revolution in the Lymes: From the New Lights to the Sons of Liberty. Arcadia Publishing. ISBN 978-1-4671-3596-2.
