= Ken Yonker =

American politician

Member of the Michigan House of Representatives from the 72nd district
- In office January 1, 2011 – January 1, 2017
- Preceded by: Justin Amash
- Succeeded by: Steve Johnson

Personal details
- Born: December 16, 1956 (age 69) Grand Rapids, Michigan, U.S.
- Party: Republican
- Spouse: Amy Yonker
- Education: Michigan State University
- Website: State Rep. Ken Yonker

Ken Yonker (born December 16, 1956) is an American politician and businessman who served as a member of the Michigan House of Representatives from 2011 to 2017. A graduate of Michigan State University, Yonker is the founder and owner of Yonker's Landscaping and was a manager for a local construction company. He worked with Wycliffe Bible Translators.

In 2017, Yonker was disciplined for using his county vehicle for personal reasons to oppose a local ballot proposal.
