= John Sill Rogers =

American politician

John Sill Rogers (April 15, 1796 – December 28, 1860) was an American politician.

Rogers was born in Lyme, Connecticut on April 15, 1796, to Gideon and Lucy Rogers (née Ackley). After attending Bacon Academy in Colchester, Connecticut, he would study medicine at the Yale School of Medicine. He was a medical doctor and a farmer until 1837. He represented the town in the Connecticut General Assembly in 1821, 1822 and 1832, as well as being a member of the Connecticut State Senate in 1835. Following his removal to Rome, Ohio in 1837, he would represent Ashtabula County in the Ohio House of Representatives in 1839.

Rogers married Matilda Lord from Lyme, Connecticut on February 10, 1822, and had two daughters, Charlotte Augusta Swan and Helen Stone (Lord). He also had two half brothers, Deacon Chester Andrews and Reverend Wells Andrews.

He died in Rome, Ohio on December 28, 1860, aged 64.
