= Becket Hill State Park Reserve =

State park in Lyme, Connecticut, US

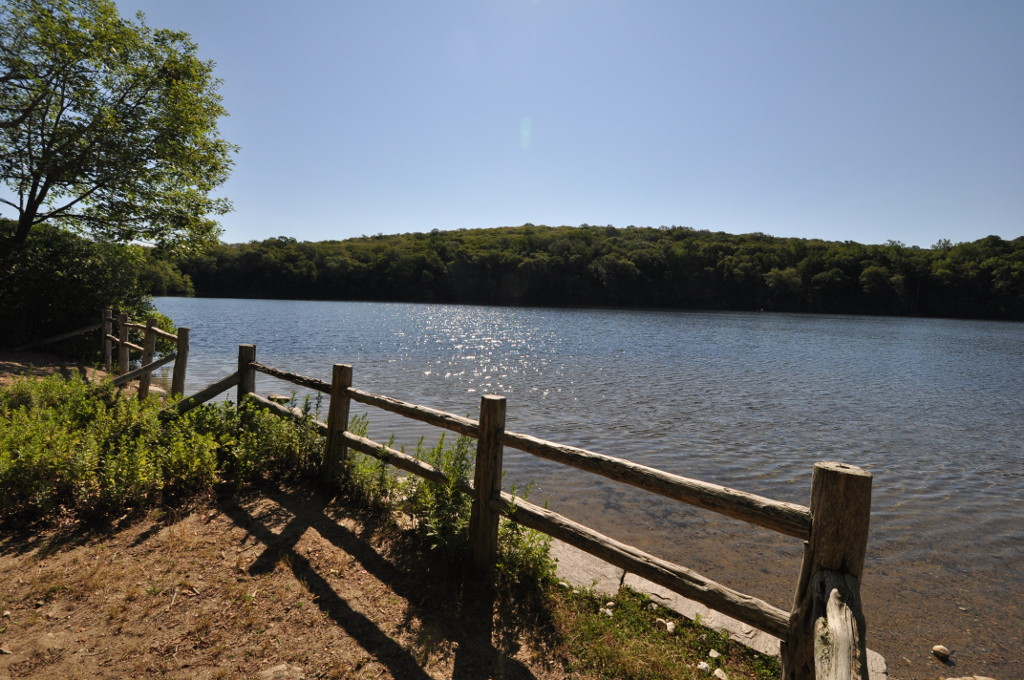
- Becket Hill, as seen across Uncas Pond from Nehantic State Forest

- Location within Connecticut
- Interactive map of Becket Hill State Park Reserve
- Location: Lyme, Connecticut, United States
- Coordinates: 41°22′20″N 72°17′59″W
- Area: 260 acres (110 ha)
- Elevation: 262 ft (80 m)
- Established: 1961
- Administrator: Connecticut Department of Energy and Environmental Protection
- Designation: Connecticut state park
- Website: Other State Parks and Forests

Becket Hill State Park Reserve is a public recreation area lying adjacent to Nehantic State Forest in the town of Lyme, Connecticut. The state park is as an undeveloped, walk-in park totaling 260 acres (110 ha) with no officially listed activities. It is managed by the Connecticut Department of Energy and Environmental Protection.

== History ==
Becket Hill State Park Reserve is named for an early settler of the area named Beckwith; the land was part of the Nehantic tribe's territory. In 1961, the land for the reserve was given to the state by the George Dudley Seymour Trust, to become the 76th designated Connecticut state park. Beckett Hill was listed on the Connecticut Register and Manual for 1962 as having 260 acres of undeveloped land.

== Activities ==
The reserve is an undeveloped, walk-in park with access through the Lyme section of Nehantic State Forest, which is entered from Connecticut Route 156. Bushwhacking is required as no roads or trails cross from the forest to the state park reserve. The reserve's boundary with the state forest is created by 69-acre (28 ha) Uncas Lake and Falls Brook, a stream that connects Uncas Lake with 30-acre (12 ha) Norwich Pond. Boat launches for non-motorized craft are located on each. The waters are stocked with brook, brown and rainbow trout; other fish include largemouth bass, yellow perch and sunfish.
