= Allen Tucker (Medal of Honor) =

- Born: c. 1838; Lyme, Connecticut, US
- Died: February 22, 1903
- Burial place: Evergreen Cemetery, New Haven, Connecticut
- Military career
- Allegiance: United States
- Branch: United States Army
- Rank: Sergeant
- Unit: 10th Connecticut Infantry Regiment
- Conflicts: Third Battle of Petersburg; American Civil War
- Awards: Medal of Honor

Allen Tucker (c. 1838 – February 22, 1903) was an American soldier who fought in the American Civil War. Tucker received his country's highest award for bravery during combat, the Medal of Honor. Tucker's medal was won for his extraordinary heroism during the assault on Fort Gregg during the Third Battle of Petersburg in Virginia, on April 2, 1865. He was honored with the award on May 10, 1894.

Tucker was born in Lyme, Connecticut, and entered service in Franklin, Connecticut. He was buried in at Evergreen Cemetery in New Haven, Connecticut.

== Medal of Honor citation ==
The President of the United States of America, in the name of Congress, takes pleasure in presenting the Medal of Honor to Sergeant Allen Tucker, United States Army, for extraordinary heroism on 2 April 1865, while serving with Company F, 10th Connecticut Infantry, in action at Petersburg, Virginia, for gallantry as Color Bearer in the assault on Fort Gregg.

== See also ==
- List of American Civil War Medal of Honor recipients: T–Z
