= Hamburg Bridge Historic District =

Historic district in Connecticut, United States

- U.S. National Register of Historic Places
- U.S. Historic district
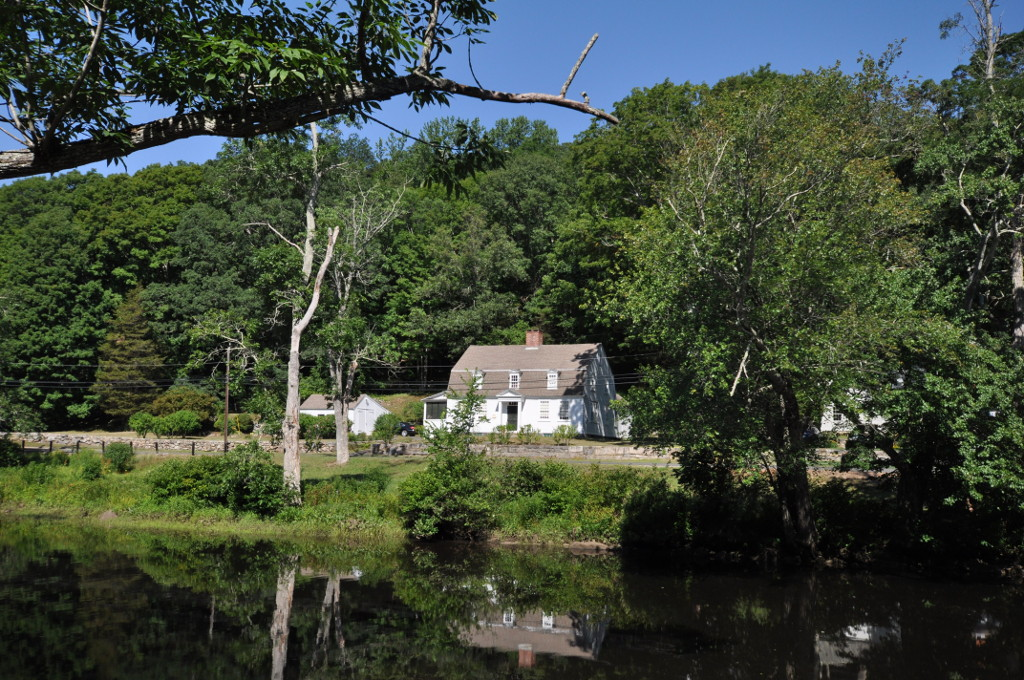

- Location within Connecticut Location within the United States
- Location: Joshuatown Road and Old Hamburg Road, Lyme, Connecticut
- Coordinates: 41°23′36″N 72°21′9″W
- Area: 21 acres (8.5 ha)
- Built: 1759
- Architect: Multiple
- Architectural style: Greek Revival, Colonial, Queen Anne
- NRHP reference No.: 83001288
- Added to NRHP: March 10, 1983

The Hamburg Bridge Historic District is located in Lyme, Connecticut. It encompasses a small village which was of economic importance until about 1824, as the site of a bridge across the Eight Mile River since 1759, and as the head of navigation of the river, which feeds the Connecticut River at Hamburg Cove. The district includes 10 houses, all of which are historically significant, as well as old stone wharves dating to the period. The district was added to the National Register of Historic Places on March 10, 1983.

== Description and history ==
The Eight Mile River takes its name from the location of its mouth, 8 miles (13 km) above the mouth of the Connecticut River, which it feeds via Hamburg Cove. Hamburg Bridge is located at a narrow point in the river, where it becomes shallowed and can no longer be passed by deep draft ships. A bridge has been standing at this site since 1759, and the area just below this head of navigation became the site of a small waterfront community. By 1800 (the first year for which reliable land records of the area are available), there were houses, shops, and wharves lining both sides of the river below the bridge. The area was economically successful until about 1824, when a deep-water channel was dredged to the village center of Hamburg, a short way downriver. The Hamburg Bridge area then waned economically, with no significant new development.

The district is 21 acres (8.5 ha) in size, and contains 10 houses, nine of which date to either the 18th or early 19th century (the tenth was built in 1879. They are all of wood frame construction, and architecturally vernacular, typically with modest stylistic embellishments from alterations. The properties that include waterfront footage also typically have a stone-lined landing area or projecting wharf. The current bridge is a three-arch concrete structure built in 1936.

== See also ==
- National Register of Historic Places listings in New London County, Connecticut
