= Hamburg Cove Site =

Archaeological site in Connecticut, United States

- U.S. National Register of Historic Places
- Location: Lyme, Connecticut
- Area: 5.2 acres (2.1 ha)
- MPS: Lower Connecticut River Valley Woodland Period Archaeological TR
- NRHP reference No.: 87001225
- Added to NRHP: October 15, 1987

The Hamburg Cove Site is a prehistoric archaeological site in Lyme, Connecticut. The site is believed to constitute a significant Native American habitation site, located near the mouth of the Eight Mile River at Hamburg Cove. Probably occupied between the Early and Late Woodland Periods, finds at the site include large numbers of deer bones, suggestive of extended occupation. Other features of the site include fireplace hearths, post moulds, and the remains of small mammals and turtles.

The site was listed on the National Register of Historic Places in 1987.

== See also ==
- National Register of Historic Places listings in New London County, Connecticut
