= Jonathan Parsons =

Christian New England clergyman (1853–1705)

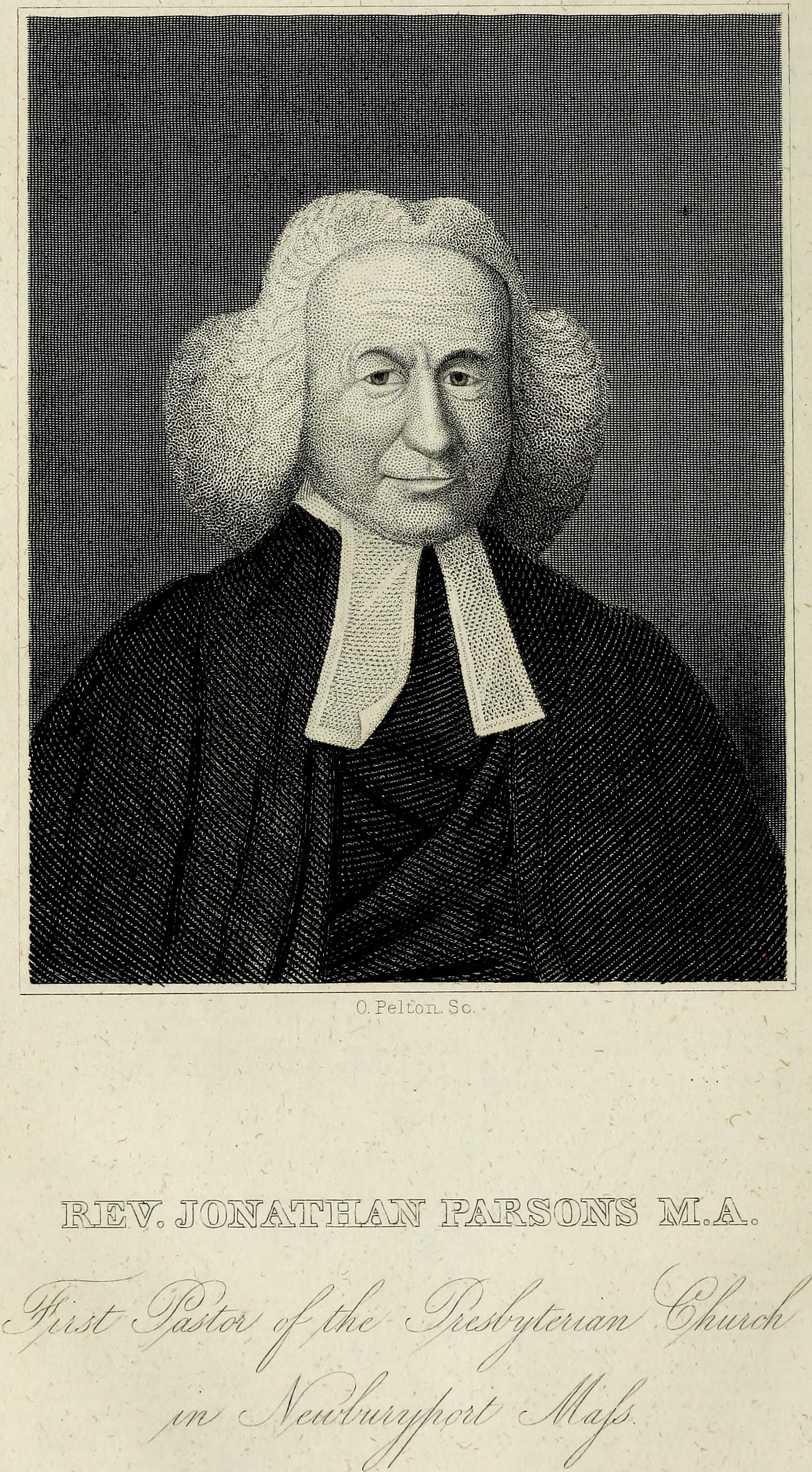
- Born: 30 November 1705
- Died: 19 July 1776 (aged 70)
- Education: Yale University
- Children: Samuel and 1 other son

Jonathan Parsons (November 30, 1705 – July 19, 1776) was a Christian New England clergyman during the late colonial period and a supporter of the American Revolution. Born in West Springfield, Massachusetts, he was the youngest son of Ebenezer (Deacon) Parsons (1668-1752) and Margaret Marshfield of Springfield. He was intended for an artisan career, but the Rev. Jonathan Edwards, then a tutor at Yale, persuaded young Parsons to prepare for college.

== Education and early career ==
Parsons entered Yale at the age of 20, graduating in 1729. He studied theology with Yale President Elisha Williams and with Edwards, by then minister of the church in nearby Northampton.

Parsons took charge of the Congregational Church at Lyme, Connecticut, in 1731. He fell in love with Phebe Griswold, eldest daughter of the town's leading family (her brother, Matthew Griswold, would serve as governor of Connecticut). For the first decade of his career, Parsons was an upstanding member of the colony's religious establishment: Arminian in his theological inclinations and fond of the material benefits of being community leader. It is said that he "had a passion for fine clothes, for gold and silver lace, and ruffled shirt fronts, which distressed some of the good Puritans of his Church."

== Parsons as evangelical leader ==
Like many of his contemporaries, however, Parsons would be swept up in the religious turbulence of the Great Awakening. He suffered increasing doubts about the reality of his conversion and the hazards of works as a basis for salvation. After a "severe and prolonged mental struggle," the "doctrine of salvation by faith burst as a 'new light' on his mind. His preaching was marked by greater earnestness and simplicity. He became, in the words of one contemporary, a "burning and shining light."

One witness to his preaching at Lyme in the late 1730s wrote, "with what astounding terrors have I heard him represent the torments of Hell, and the imminent, amazing danger of the impenitent sinner. With what glowing colors and sweetly surprising language would he paint the glories of Heaven, and describe the holy and elevated joys of immortality. In what melting strains would he represent the sufferings of Christ and his undying love for sinners. . . . Such was the apparent fervor of his spirit, and the tender emotion of his compassionate heart, that he would sometimes appear as a flame of fire, and then all dissolved in tears."

Parsons' embrace of the Awakening was sealed by his encounter with the great British evangelist, George Whitefield, who toured the colonies in 1740. Parsons was undoubtedly present when Whitefield preached at Middletown, an event that drew thousands from the surrounding countryside. Whitefield later visited Lyme twice, preaching from Parsons' pulpit at a time when many churches were closing their doors to the "New Lights." Parsons also tried to deliver the awakening experience to individuals on face-to-face terms, dedicating his time to the converted who needed his guidance. As he recalls in his diary, sometimes as many as thirty people came to his study for counsel one day.

In Lyme, as elsewhere, the revival shattered congregational unity. Opposition to Parsons' views—and concern about his evangelical forays beyond his own parish—led eventually to his ouster in 1745. By this point, Parsons was acknowledged one of the most prominent and eloquent leaders of the Awakening. He was invited to preach throughout eastern Connecticut and in Massachusetts. His sermons were published and widely circulated. In 1744, at the invitation of Boston minister Thomas Prince, he wrote an authoritative account of the revival at Lyme.

== From Lyme to Newburyport ==
With help from Whitefield, Parsons was invited to take charge of a new Presbyterian congregation in Newburyport, Massachusetts. The church was run along radically democratic lines, without any influence from "councils, conferences or synods". In fact, rather than being Presbyterian in polity, the church was what might be called an "independent" or "strict" Congregationalist body. In the thirty years Parsons served the church, it would grow from nineteen members to being one of the largest congregations in New England.

Whitefield visited Parsons during his last tour of New England in 1770. Taken ill, Whitefield died in Parsons' house and was interred in a crypt constructed under the pulpit. His funeral, at which Parsons preached, was attended by thousands. The tomb, which would soon carry Parsons own remains as well, became a shrine for New England evangelicals.

== Revolutionary agitator ==
Like many of his fellow New Lights, Parsons became an early and outspoken supporter of American resistance to England. When New England revolutionaries resolved to resist the tea tax, Parsons organized the young women of his congregation to brew local herbs in place of imported tea. The Boston Massacre victims were mourned by the tolling bell of the "Old South," Parsons' church.

On that day, Parsons preached a notable sermon on the sacrifices of the dead and the duties of the living. "As the clouds darkened and the skies thundered, the voice of Parsons grew louder and clearer, like bugle notes summoning the good men and true to battle."

When the news came of Lexington and Concord, Parsons stood in his pulpit to preach to the people of liberty and their rights. "As he closed his final appeal, his people hung breathless upon his words, and each seemed more anxious than the other to catch his ever utterance. 'Men of America, citizens of this great country hanging upon the precipice of war, loyalty to England lies behind you, broken by the acts of the mother country--a cruel mother, deaf to the voice of liberty and right; duty to freedom, duty to your country, duty to God, is before you; your patriotism is brought to the test; I call upon those ready to volunteer for the defence of the provinces against British tyranny to step into the 'broad aisle.'" Those who responded were the first volunteers to join the Continental Army and participate in the Battle of Bunker Hill.

Parsons died on July 19, 1776, a few days after the Declaration of Independence. He was buried next to his mentor, George Whitefield, in the crypt under the pulpit from which he had preached for more than three decades. One son, Samuel Holden Parsons would rise to the rank of Major General in the Continental Army. Another, Jonathan, would participate in the Penobscot Expedition, the boldest naval adventure of the Revolution. A grandson, midshipman William Walter Parsons, would be taken prisoner by the British during the Penobscot Expedition.

== Sources ==
- Franklin Bowditch Dexter. "Jonathan Parsons." In "Biographical Sketches of the Graduates of Yale College," Volume I (1701-1745). New York, NY: Henry Holt & Company.
- Charles Samuel Hall. 1896. "Hall Ancestry" New York, NY: G.P. Putnam's Sons.
- Charles Samuel Hall. 1905. "Life and Letters of General Samuel Holden Parsons." Binghamton, NY: Otseningo Publishing Company.
- Heimert, Alan. 1966. "Religion and the American Mind, from the Great Awakening to the Revolution." Cambridge, MA: Harvard University Press.
- Alan Heimert & Perry Miller (eds.). 1967. "The Great Awakening. Documents Illustrating the Crisis and Its Consequences." Indianapolis, IN: Bobbs-Merrill.
- George M. Marsden. 2004. "Jonathan Edwards: A Life." New Haven, CT: Yale University Press.
- Jonathan Parsons. 1742. "A Needful Caution in a Critical Day. Or, the Christian Urged to Strict Watchfulness, that the Contrary Part may have no evil Thing to say of him." A Discourse deliver'd at Lyme, 4 February 1741/42." New London, CT.
- Jonathan Parsons. 1742. "Wisdom Justified of her Children. A Sermon Preached at the Publick Lecture in Boston, on Thursday, September 16, 1742."
- Jonathan Parsons. 1748. "The Doctrine of Justification by Faith Asserted and Explained; and some Exceptions thereto considered: Being Three Lecture-Discourses, Deliver'd in Newbury, November and December, 1747. Boston.
- Jonathan Parsons. 1751. "Manna gathered in the Morning. Or, Christ the True Manna, to be received and fed upon daily by Young and Old. Being the substance of a Discourse deliver'd at Newbury." Boston.
- Jonathan Parsons. 1756. "Good News from a Far Country." In Seven Discourses from I Tim 1, 15. Delivered in Newbury. Portsmouth.
- Jonathan Parsons (with John Moorhead and David MacGregore). 1756. "A Fair Narrative of the Proceedings of the Presbytery of Boston against the Rev. Mr. Robert Abercrombie." Boston.
- Jonathan Parsons (with David MacGregore). 1758. "A Rejoinder to the Reverend Mr. Robert Abercrobie's Late Remarks on a fair Narrative of the Proceedings of the Bresbytery of Boston, against himself." Boston.
- Jonathan Parsons. 1759. "Two Discourses concerning the Importance of the Bellief and Profession of the Gospel to Eternal Salvation." Boston.
- Jonathan Parsons. 1768. "A Funeral Sermon. Occasioned by the Death of Mr. Ebenezer Little, one of the Elders of the Presbyterian Church in Newbury-port." Salem.
- Jonathan Parsons. "Communion of Faith necessary to Communion of Churches." Salem.
- Jonathan Parsons. 1770. "To live is Christ, to die is gain. A Funeral Sermon on the Death of the Rev. George Whitefield." Portsmouth.
- Jonathan Parsons. 1774. "Freedom from Civil and Ecclesiastical Slavery, the purchase of Christ. A Discourse offered to a numerous assembly on March 5, 1774, at the Presbyterian Meeting House, in Newbury-port." Newbury-port.
- Jonathan Parsons. 1770. "A Patriotic Discourse in Commemoration of the Boston Massacre." Newburyport.
- Jonathan Parsons. 1780. "Sixty Sermons on various Subjects, to which is prefixed a Funeral Sermon by the Rev. Mr. Searl." Newbury-port.
- Harry S. Stout. 1991. "The Divine Dramatist: George Whitefield and the Rise of Modern Evangelism." Grand Rapids, MI: W.B. Eerdmans.
