= Steven M. Johnson =

American cartoonist

- Born: May 12, 1938 (age 88)
- Education: University of California, Berkeley

Steven Maxwell Johnson (born May 12, 1938) is an American cartoonist, futurist, and inventor.

== Early life and education ==
Steven Maxwell Johnson was born in 1938. He grew up in the San Francisco Bay Area. He attended Yale for two years, then earned his BA from the University of California, Berkeley.

His family were book publishers. His father, Paul C. Johnson, edited the Western Garden Book for Sunset Books. Steve Johnson’s maternal grandfather was Herbert E. Bolton, chairman of History at the University of California, Berkeley, and Director of its Bancroft Library. Bolton either began, or fell for, the hoax that the “plate of brass” found in 1933 was left by Sir Francis Drake in 1579. The plate was later exposed to be a prank of E Clampus Vitus, including scholars who knew Bolton well.

== Career ==
Johnson was a city planner in the 1960s and 1970s. Johnson helped plan suburbs.

In 1973, the Sierra Club Bulletin hired him to be their editorial cartoonist. The next year he was assigned to create 16 future RVs in cartoons. He created 109 RV designs. This was the start of his artistic career and created his interest in inventing.

The Sacramento Bee hired him as an artist in 1978. He anticipated factory-torn clothes in 1975, the Roomba and video camera helmets in 1991, Google Glass in 1992, and hands-free telephones. His inventions were often given names using puns. The art had deadpan captions. Unlike some of his inventions, factory-scratched cars, shoes with headlights and turn-signals, and quickie add-a-rooms for houses have not yet been made real.

Sierra and Sacramento Bee illustrations filled Johnson’s first two books, What the World Needs Now and Public Therapy Buses. Impressed by those, Honda Motor Co. hired him in 1994 to analyze future trends. He retired in 2005. Johnson published anthologies of cartoon inventions almost every year in the 2010s to sell at Maker Faires, and art, cartoon, and regional events.

== Personal life ==
He lives in Carmichael, California, with his wife and son.
