= Steve Johnson (Michigan politician) =

American politician

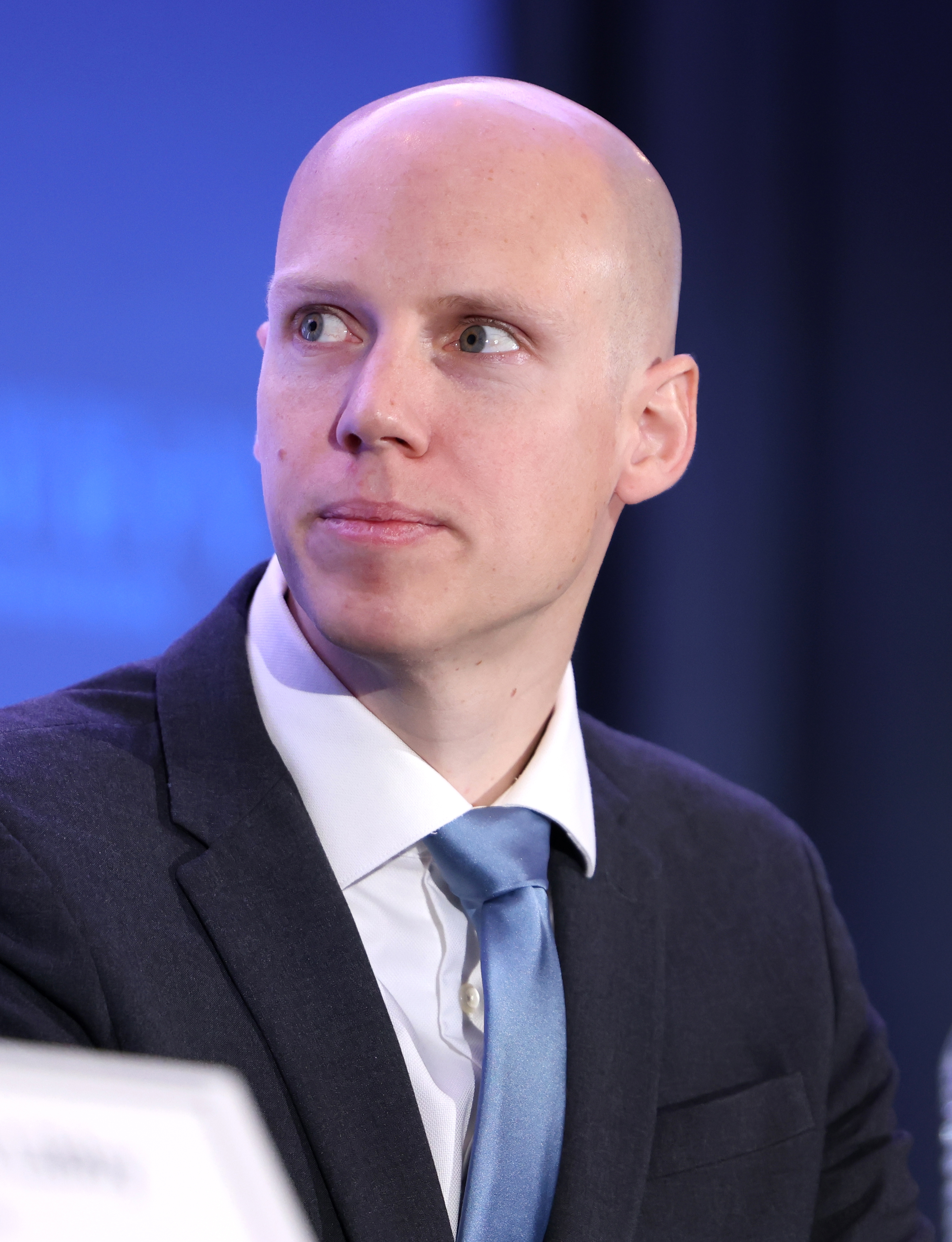
- Johnson at the Hazlitt Summit hosted by Young Americans for Liberty, 2024

Member of the Michigan House of Representatives from the 72nd district
- In office January 1, 2017 – January 1, 2023
- Preceded by: Ken Yonker
- Succeeded by: Mike Mueller

Personal details
- Born: December 2, 1990 (age 35) Allegan County, Michigan, U.S.
- Party: Republican
- Education: Community College of the Air Force; Liberty University (BA)

Military service
- Branch: United States Air Force
- Rank: Staff Sergeant

Steven B. Johnson (born December 2, 1990) is an American politician. He was a Republican member of the Michigan House of Representatives, elected to represent Michigan's 72nd House of Representatives district in 2016.

== Early life ==
Johnson attended South Christian High School in Byron Center, Michigan. After graduating in 2009, he joined the United States Air Force where he served for four years working on nuclear missile electronics in Montana. He received an associates degree in electronic systems technology from the Community College of the Air Force. He later graduated with an online bachelor's degree from Liberty University using the G.I. Bill.

In the summer of 2015, he interned for representative Cindy Gamrat. He stayed briefly in Canada before moving to Alaska to start a handyman company with a friend.

== Michigan House of Representatives ==
Johnson said he returned to Michigan due to politics. He defeated Democrat Steve Shoemaker with 59% in the November 2016 election to win the Michigan's 72nd House of Representatives district, replacing termed-out Ken Yonker. The district includes southern Kent County and western Allegan County, Michigan.

Johnson had a self-described "constitutionally-driven agenda" going into his first term. He wanted to lower taxes by eliminating the Michigan Economic Development Corporation and lowering the corporate income tax. Johnson and Representative Tom Leonard were in favor of transitioning the teacher pension system to the 401(k) plan. He supported a Religious Freedom Restoration Act in Michigan. The law allowed legal requirements for religious objections but was struck down at the federal level in 1997, leaving its adoption to individual states. Johnson also took a "life at conception" stance on abortion.

During the COVID-19 pandemic in Michigan, Johnson voted against Governor Gretchen Whitmer's stay-at-home order extension in April 2020, citing concerns about potential negative economic impacts and contradictory language regarding who is and isn't allowed outside.

On October 10, 2021, Johnson co-sponsored House Bill 5444 also known as the "fetal heartbeat protection act."

== Personal life ==
Johnson is a deacon at Wayland Christian Reformed Church.

Political offices
Preceded by Ken Yonker	Michigan Representatives; 72nd District; 2017–2023	Succeeded by Mike Mueller
