= Lyme, Connecticut =

Town in New London County

Lyme
- Town
- Town of Lyme
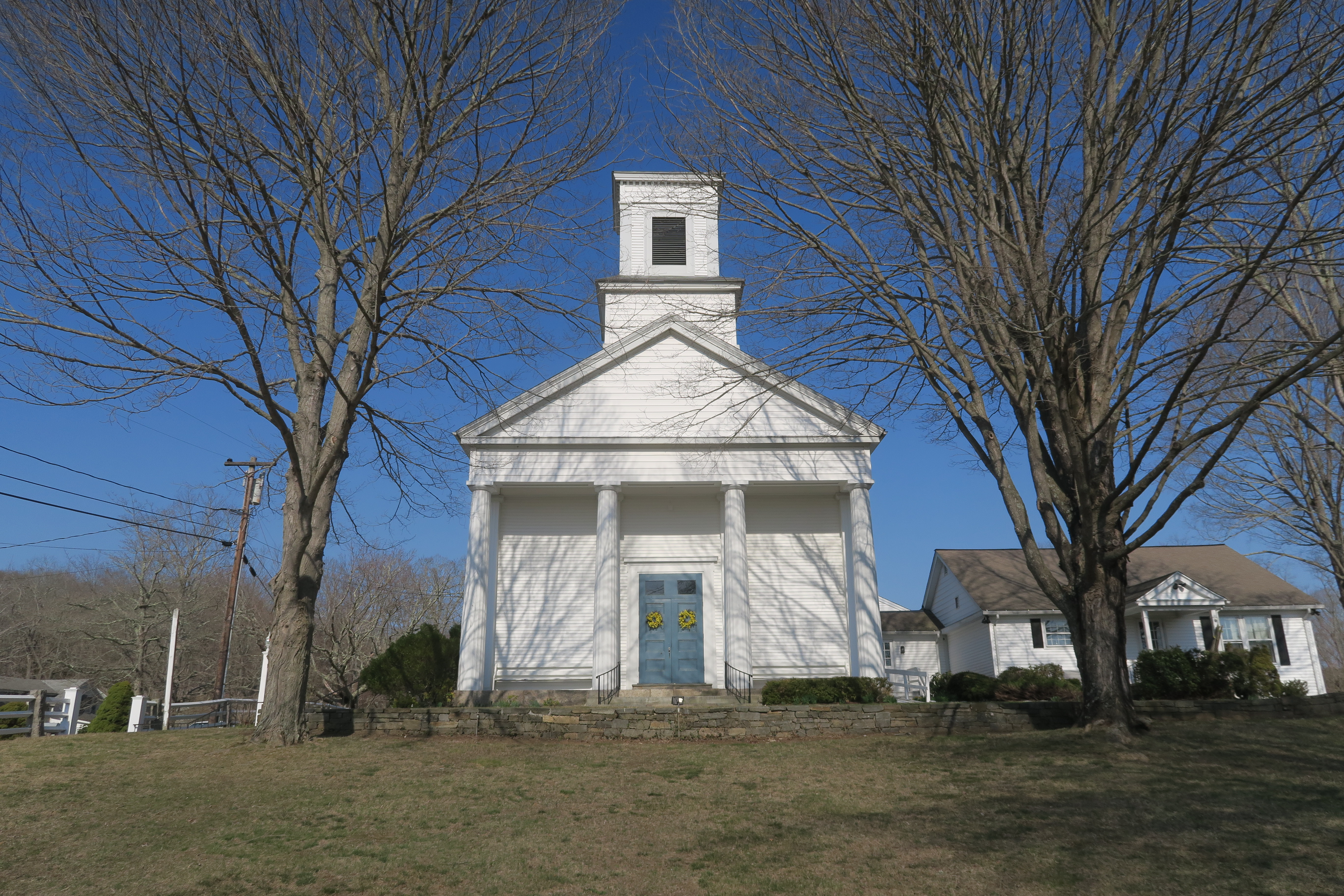
- First Congregational Church

- Seal
- Interactive map of Lyme
- Coordinates: 41°24′N 72°21′W
- Country: United States
- U.S. state: Connecticut
- County: New London
- Region: Lower CT River Valley
- Settled: 1645
- Incorporated: February 13, 1667

Government
  - Type: Selectman-town meeting
  - First selectwoman: Christine Zelek (I)

Area
  - Total: 34.5 sq mi (89.4 km^{2})
  - Land: 31.9 sq mi (82.5 km^{2})
  - Water: 2.6 sq mi (6.8 km^{2})
- Elevation: 26 ft (8 m)

Population (2020)
  - Total: 2,352
  - Density: 73.8/sq mi (28.5/km^{2})
- Time zone: UTC-5 (Eastern)
  - Summer (DST): UTC-4 (Eastern)
- ZIP code: 06371 (Old Lyme PO) and 06439 (Hadlyme PO)
- Area codes: 860/959
- FIPS code: 09-44210
- GNIS feature ID: 0213453
- Website: townlyme.org

Lyme is a town in New London County, Connecticut, United States, situated on the eastern side of the Connecticut River. The town is part of the Lower Connecticut River Valley Planning Region. The population was 2,352 at the 2020 census. Lyme is the eponym of Lyme disease.

== History ==
Marinas at Hamburg Cove in Lyme

In February 1665, the portion of the territory of the Saybrook Colony east of the Connecticut River was set off as the plantation of East Saybrook, which included present-day Lyme, Old Lyme, and the western part of East Lyme. In 1667, the Connecticut General Court formally recognized the East Saybrook plantation as the town of Lyme, named after Lyme Regis, a coastal town in the southwest of England. The eastern portion of Lyme (bordering the town of Waterford) separated from Lyme in 1823 and became part of East Lyme. The southern portion of Lyme (along Long Island Sound) separated in 1855 as South Lyme (renamed Old Lyme in 1857). Both changes were consistent with the then-existing laws of the state of Connecticut.

== Geography ==
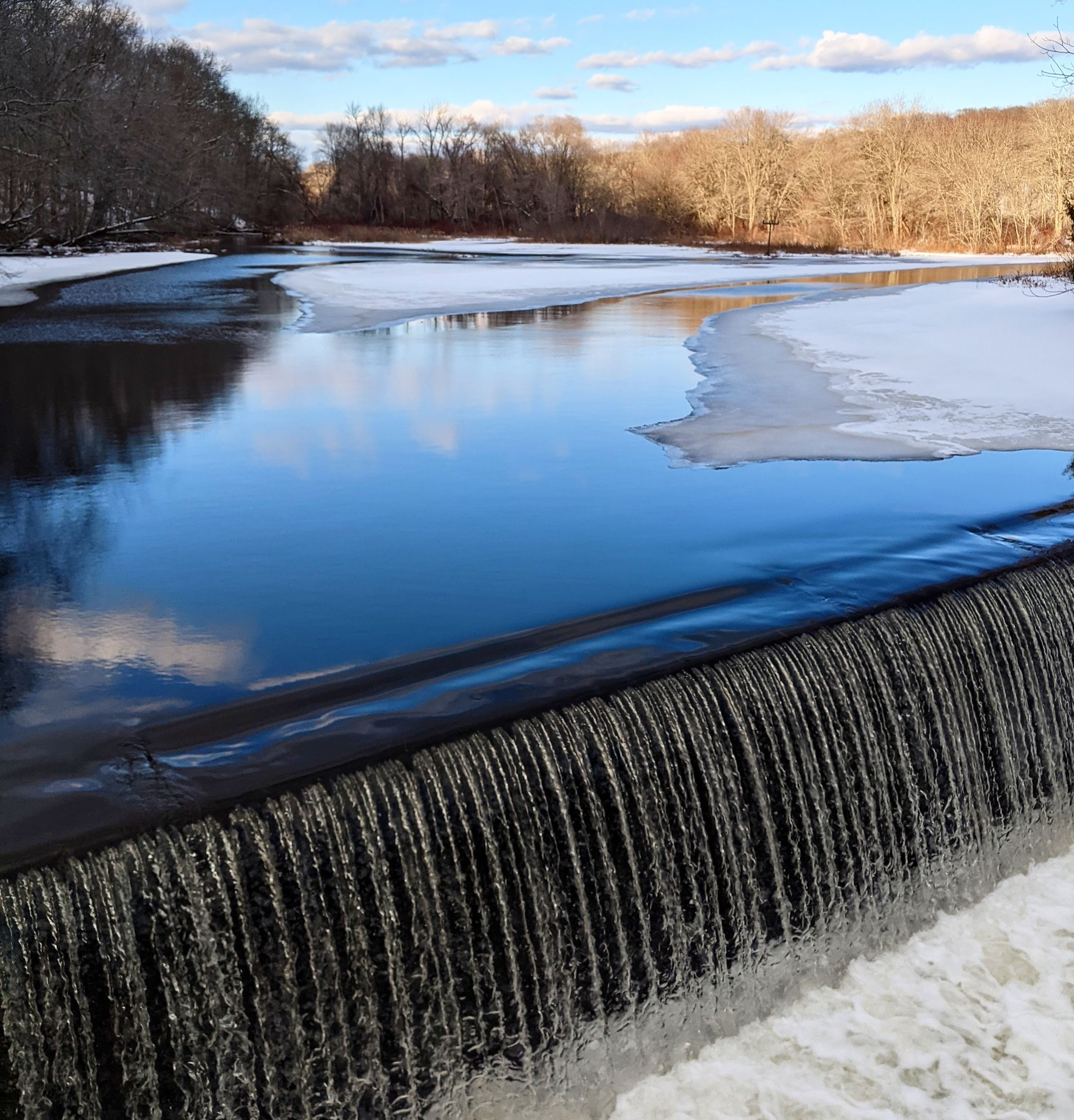
Moulson Pond on the Eightmile River

According to the United States Census Bureau, the town has a total area of 34.5 square miles (89 km^{2}), of which 31.9 square miles (83 km^{2}) are land and 2.6 square miles (6.7 km^{2}), or 7.63%, are water.

The Village of Hamburg in 1868

=== Principal communities ===
- Hadlyme
- Hamburg (town center)
- North Lyme

Other minor communities and geographic areas are Becket Hill, Bill Hill, Brockway's Ferry (also known as Brockway Landing), Brush Hill, Elys Ferry, Grassy Hill, Gungy, Joshuatown, Lord Hill, Mt. Archer, Pleasant Valley, Rogers Lake West Shore, and Sterling City.

=== Principal bodies of water ===
==== Coves along the Connecticut River ====
- Hamburg Cove.
- Lord Cove (a brackish tidal marsh, fed in part by Lord, Deep, and Mack creeks).
- Selden Cove.
- Whalebone Cove (aka Hadlyme Cove or North Cove).

==== Lakes and ponds ====
- Cedar Lake (formed by the damming of Cedar Pond Brook).
- Joshua Pond – a.k.a. Lower Pond (east of Brockways Ferry Road; formed by the damming of Joshua Creek).
- Moulsons Pond (formed by the damming of Eightmile River).
- Norwich Pond (formed by the damming of Falls Brook).
- Rogers Lake (partly in Lyme; formed by the damming of Mill Brook, the dam now equipped with a fish ladder).
- Uncas Pond (formed by the damming of Falls Brook).
- Upper Pond (along Tantumorantum Road; formed by the damming of Joshua Creek).

==== Rivers, creeks, and brooks ====
- Eightmile River; a federally designated "Wild and Scenic River."
- Beaver Brook (a tributary of Eightmile River).
- Broad Swamp Brook (a tributary of Grassy Hill Brook).
- Cedar Pond Brook (a tributary of Beaver Brook).
- Cranberry Meadow Brook (a tributary of Eightmile River).
- Deep Creek (a tributary of the Connecticut River).
- East Branch Eightmile River (a tributary of Eightmile River).
- Falls Brook (a tributary of Eightmile River and Hamburg Cove).
- Grassy Hill Brook (mostly in Lyme, but crosses into Old Lyme before feeding into Rogers Lake).
- Hemlock Valley Brook (a tributary of Whalebone Creek).
- Hungerford Brook (a tributary of Whalebone Creek).
- Joshua Creek – a.k.a. Rams Horn Creek (a tributary of the Connecticut River).
- Lord Creek (a tributary of the Connecticut River).
- Mack Creek (a tributary of the Connecticut River).
- Mill Brook (enters Rogers Lake in Lyme and exits the lake in Old Lyme; a tributary of the Lieutenant River).
- Roaring Brook (a tributary of Whalebone Creek).
- Selden Creek (a tributary of the Connecticut River).
- Whalebone Creek (mouth is located at the head of Whalebone Cove).

== Demographics ==
Historical population
| Census | Pop. | Note | %± |
|---|---|---|---|
| 1820 | 4,069 | | — |
| 1850 | 2,668 | | — |
| 1860 | 1,246 | | −53.3% |
| 1870 | 1,181 | | −5.2% |
| 1880 | 1,025 | | −13.2% |
| 1890 | 977 | | −4.7% |
| 1900 | 750 | | −23.2% |
| 1910 | 746 | | −0.5% |
| 1920 | 674 | | −9.7% |
| 1930 | 546 | | −19.0% |
| 1940 | 717 | | 31.3% |
| 1950 | 857 | | 19.5% |
| 1960 | 1,183 | | 38.0% |
| 1970 | 1,484 | | 25.4% |
| 1980 | 1,822 | | 22.8% |
| 1990 | 1,949 | | 7.0% |
| 2000 | 2,016 | | 3.4% |
| 2010 | 2,406 | | 19.3% |
| 2020 | 2,352 | | −2.2% |
U.S. Decennial Census

=== 2010 and 2020 censuses ===
As of the 2010 census, Lyme had a population of 2,406. Its racial and ethnic makeup was 96.5% non-Hispanic white, 0.1% non-Hispanic black, 0.1% non-Hispanic Native American, 1.0% Asian, 0.1% non-Hispanic from some other race, 0.6% from two or more races and 1.7% Hispanic or Latino.

=== Voter registration ===
Voter registration and party enrollment as of November 1, 2022.
| Party | Active voters | Inactive voters | Total voters | Percentage |
|---|---|---|---|---|
| Republican | 464 | 6 | 470 | 23.81% |
| Democratic | 742 | 15 | 757 | 38.35% |
| Unaffiliated | 699 | 20 | 719 | 36.42% |
| Minor Parties | 28 | 0 | 28 | 1.42% |
| Total | 1,933 | 41 | 1974 | 100% |

The number of Lyme residents registering with the Democratic party has grown in recent years, from 541 in 2015 to 757 in 2022.

=== Ancestry/Ethnicity ===
According to the United States Census Bureau, as of 2017 the largest (those over 1% of the population) self-identified ancestry/ethnic groups in Lyme were:

| Largest ancestries (2017) | Percent |
|---|---|
| English ancestry | 30.5% |
| Irish ancestry | 19.8% |
| German ancestry | 14.2% |
| Italian ancestry | 11.7% |
| American ancestry | 7.3% |
| Polish ancestry | 6.3% |
| Scottish ancestry | 4.9% |
| French-Canadian ancestry | 3.5% |
| Swedish ancestry | 2.4% |
| Norwegian ancestry | 1.6% |
| Swiss ancestry | 1.5% |
| Russian ancestry | 1.2% |

== Public facilities ==
=== Civic and fraternal ===
- Hadlyme Public Hall (63 Ferry Road)
- Lyme Consolidated School (478 Hamburg Road)
- Lyme Grange Hall (2 Sterling City Road)
- Lyme Public Hall Association (249 Hamburg Road)
- Lyme Public Library (482 Hamburg Road)
- Lyme Volunteer Fire Co. Hadlyme Station (6 Norwich Salem Road)
- Lyme Volunteer Fire Co. Lyme Station (213 Hamburg Road)

=== Governmental ===
- Hadlyme Ferry Boat Launch (154 Ferry Road)
- Hadlyme Post Office (1 Ferry Road)
- Lyme Town Hall (480 Hamburg Road)

=== Religious ===
- The First Congregational Church of Lyme (Sterling City Road)

== Points of interest ==
=== State parks and forests ===
Selden Neck State Park and Becket Hill State Park Reserve are wholly located in Lyme. Nehantic State Forest and Gillette Castle State Park are partly located in Lyme.

=== On the National Register of Historic Places ===
- Cooper Site, added November 15, 1987.
- Gillette Castle (partly in Lyme), added July 31, 1986.
- Hadlyme Ferry Historic District, added December 21, 1994.
- Hamburg Bridge Historic District (Joshuatown Road and Old Hamburg Road), added April 10, 1983.
- Hamburg Cove Site, added November 15, 1987.
- Lord Cove Site, added November 15, 1987.
- Selden Island Site, added November 15, 1987.

== Public transportation ==
The Estuary Transit District provides public transportation throughout Lyme and the surrounding towns through its 9 Town Transit Service. Services include connections to Old Saybrook station, served by Amtrak and Shore Line East railroads.

== Lyme in literature, art, and film ==
- Sleep, Andy Warhol's 1964 movie, was filmed in Lyme.

== Notable people ==
- Robert Ballard (born 1942), lives in Lyme; oceanographer
- Joan Bennett (1910–1990), buried in Lyme; film and television actress
- Hiel Brockway (died 1842), born in Lyme; founder of Brockport, New York
- Zebulon Brockway (1827–1920), born in Lyme; penologist; "Father of prison reform" in the United States
- Daniel Chadwick (1825–1884), born in Lyme; lawyer and politician
- Donald Barr Chidsey (1902–1981), lived in Lyme for many years; novelist and historian
- Wequash Cooke (died 1642), buried in Lyme; Native American leader
- William Diard (1924–2009), retired to Lyme and died there; operatic tenor
- Dominick Dunne (1925–2009), owned a house in (and was buried in) Lyme (Hadlyme); author, journalist, and film producer
- John Ely (1737–1800), born in Lyme; surgeon and colonel in the American Revolution
- Walker Evans (1903–1975), lived in Lyme from the 1940s through the rest of his life; photographer
- Gladys Kelley Fitch (1896–1971), lived in Lyme; artist; member Old Lyme Art Colony
- Matthew Griswold (1714–1799), born in Lyme; governor of Connecticut (1784–1786)
- Roger Griswold (1762–1812), born in Lyme; son of Matthew; US congressman (1785–1805), governor of Connecticut (1811–1812)
- Roger Hilsman (1919–2014), lived in Lyme; member Lyme Democratic Committee; World War II hero, diplomat, and author
- Harry Holtzman (1912–1987), lived in Lyme; abstract artist
- Stephen Johnson (1724–1786), minister Lyme First Congregational; pamphleteer
- Ezra Lee (1749–1821), born in Lyme; commander of the Turtle submarine during the Revolutionary War, and world's first submariner
- Beatrice Lillie (1894–1989), lived on Grassy Hill Rd, Lyme in the 1970s; Canadian-born actress
- Abijah Perkins Marvin (1813–1889), born in Lyme; minister, writer, and teacher; member of the Massachusetts Constitutional Convention of 1853
- Dudley Marvin (1786–1856), born in Lyme; New York congressman
- Charles J. McCurdy (1797–1891), born and died in Lyme; Lt. Governor of Connecticut
- William Brown Meloney (1905–1971) and Rose Franken (1895–1988), lived in Lyme; husband-wife writing and play production team
- Robert Mulligan (1925–2008), died at home in Lyme; film director; directed To Kill a Mockingbird
- Jonathan Parsons (1705–1776), Lyme clergyman
- Samuel Holden Parsons (1737–1789), born in Lyme; brigadier general in the Continental Army during the American Revolution
- Jedediah Peck (1748–1821), born in Lyme; "Father of the Common School System" in New York state
- John Sill Rogers (1796–1860), born in Lyme; physician and politician
- Timothy Rogers (1756-1834), born in Lyme; Quaker leader and founder of Newmarket and Pickering, Ontario in Canada.
- Sewell Sillman (1924–1992), lived in Lyme and died there; painter, educator, and art print publisher
- Ansel Sterling (1782–1853), born in Lyme; congressman from Connecticut
- Micah Sterling (1784–1844), born in Lyme; congressman from New York
- Allen Tucker (1838–1903), born in Lyme; Medal of Honor recipient in the American Civil War
- Henry Matson Waite (1787–1869), born in Lyme; Chief Justice of Connecticut Supreme Court
- Morrison Remick Waite (1816–1888), born in Lyme; Chief Justice of the United States
