= Steve =

- Pronunciation: /stiːv/ STEEV
- Gender: Male
- Language: English

Origin
- Languages: 1. Greek; 2. English
- Origin: Diminutive form of Stephen and Steven
- Region of origin: English-speaking world

Other names
- Alternative spelling: Stevie
- Related names: Stephen, Steven, Stevie

Steve is a masculine given name, usually a short form (hypocorism) of Steven or Stephen.

== Notable people ==
=== A–D ===
- Steve Abbott (disambiguation), several people
- Steve Abel (born 1970), New Zealand politician
- Steve Adams (disambiguation), several people
- Steve Addabbo, American record producer, songwriter and audio engineer
- Steve Agee (born 1969), American comedian, actor, writer and musician
- Steve Agnew (born 1965), English football coach and former professional football player
- Steve Alaimo (1939–2024), American singer, record & TV producer, label owner
- Steve Albini (1961–2024), American musician, record producer, audio engineer, and music journalist
- Steve Allen (1921–2000), American television personality, musician, composer, comedian and writer
- Steve Allrich, American screenwriter and painter
- Steve Alten (born 1959), American science-fiction author
- Steve Anderson, multiple people
- Steve Anthony (born 1959), Canadian former broadcaster
- Steve Anthony (wrestler) (born 1977), American professional wrestler and trainer
- Steve Antin (born 1958), American actor
- Steve Aoki (born 1977), American DJ and music producer
- Steve Armitage (born 1944), British-born Canadian sports reporter
- Steve Armstrong (born 1965), American professional wrestler
- Steve Arrington (born 1956), American singer, songwriter, drummer, record producer, engineer and minister
- Steve Asheim (born 1970), American drummer and primary songwriter
- Steve Augarde (born 1950), British author and artist
- Steve Augeri (born 1959), American singer
- Steve August (born 1954), American football player
- "Stone Cold" Steve Austin (born 1964), American professional wrestler
- Steve Axman (born 1947), American football coach
- Steve Aylett (born 1967), English author of satirical science fiction, fantasy, and slipstream
- Steve Bacic, Canadian actor
- Steve Backshall (born 1973), English naturalist, writer and television presenter
- Steve Baker (disambiguation), several people
- Steve Ballmer (born 1956), American businessman, CEO of Microsoft (2000–2014) and owner of the Los Angeles Clippers
- Steve Bannon (born 1953), American media executive, political strategist, and former investment banker
- Steve Barker (disambiguation), several people
- Steve Bartek (born 1952), American guitarist, film composer, conductor, and orchestrator
- Steve Bartelstein, American television journalist and umpire
- Steve Bays, Canadian musician, audio engineer, and producer
- Steve Beauharnais (born 1990), American football player
- Steve Belkin (born 1947), American businessman, former team owner
- Steve Bell (disambiguation), several people
- Steve Belles (born 1966), American football player
- Steve Bendelack, English filmmaker & director
- Steve Beresford (born 1950), British musician and educator
- Steve Berger (born 1973), American retired professional mixed martial artist
- Steve Berman, American editor and novelist
- Steve W. Berman, American lawyer
- Steve Beshear (born 1944), American attorney and politician
- Steve Biko (1946–1977), South African anti-apartheid activist
- Steve Billirakis (born 1986), American poker player
- Steve Binder (born 1932), American producer and director
- Steve Birnbaum (born 1991), American soccer player
- Steve Bjorklund (born c. 1960), American musician
- Steve Blackman (born 1963), American martial arts instructor, bail bondsman, and former professional wrestler
- Steve Blackman (writer), Canadian television writer, and executive producer
- Steve Blass, American baseball player and announcer
- Steve Blum (born 1960), American voice actor
- Steve Boadway (born 1963), American football player
- Steve Booker (producer), British music producer, songwriter and musician
- Steve Boone (born 1943), American bass guitarist and music producer, who is both a founding member and current member of the Folk-Rock group The Lovin' Spoonful
- Steve Borden (born 1959), ring name for American professional wrestler and former bodybuilder Sting
- Steve Borst, American screenwriter and producer
- Steve Bossé (born 1981), Canadian retired mixed martial artist and professional boxer
- Steve Bowman (born 1967), American musician and songwriter
- Steve Bracey (1950–2006), American NBA basketball player
- Steve Bracks (born 1954), Australian former politician
- Steve Bradley (1975–2008), American professional wrestler
- Steve Breitkreuz (born 1992), German professional footballer
- Steve Bren (born 1960), American racing driver and real estate developer
- Steve Brewer (born 1957), American author
- Steve Broderick (born 1981), American vocalist
- Steve Brodie (disambiguation), several people
- Steve Brodner (born 1954), American editorial cartoonist, editor, and producer
- Steve Brown (disambiguation), several people
- Steve Bruce (born 1960), English professional football manager and former player
- Steve Buccellato (born 1968), American comic artist, writer, and editor
- Steve Bullock (British politician) (born 1954), first directly elected mayor of the London Borough of Lewisham
- Steve Bullock (American politician) (born 1966), Governor of Montana, USA
- Steve Buttle (1953–2012), English professional midfielder
- Steve Burns (born 1973), American actor, filmmaker, and musician
- Steve Burton (disambiguation), several people
- Steve Burtt Jr., American-Ukrainian basketball player who played in an Israeli league
- Steve Buscemi (born 1957), American actor, director, producer, writer, and former firefighter
- Steve Byrne (born 1974), American stand-up comedian and actor
- Steve Byrnes (1959–2015), American television announcer and producer
- Steve Byrne, member of Scottish folk band Malinky
- Steve Byrne, member of English new wave band Freeze Frame
- Steve Cadro, Hungarian porn director
- Steve Callaghan, American screenwriter, producer, and voice actor
- Steve Cannon (radio) (1927–2009), American radio personality and TV host
- Steve Cannon (writer) (1935–2019), American writer
- Steve Cantwell (born 1986), American mixed martial arts fighter
- Steve Cardenas (born 1974), American martial artist and actor
- Steve Cardenas (musician), American guitarist
- Steve Caballero (born 1964), American professional skateboarder
- Steve Cardenas (born 1974), American martial artist and actor
- Steve Cardenas (musician), American musician
- Steve Carell (born 1962), American actor, comedian, director, producer and writer
- Steve Carroll, American sports broadcaster
- Steve Carter (disambiguation), several people
- Steve Carver (1945–2021), American filmmaker
- Steve Case (born 1958), American entrepreneur and businessman, founder of America Online
- Steve Casey (1908–1987), Irish sport rower and professional wrestler
- Steve Centanni, American former news reporter for Fox News Channel
- Steve Cohen (judoka) (born 1955), American Olympic judoka
- Steve Chappell, American aerospace engineer, mountain climber and aquanaut
- Steve Chen (born 1978), Taiwanese-American internet entrepreneur, YouTube co-founder
- Steve Clark (disambiguation), several people
- Steve Coleman (born 1956), American saxophonist
- Steve Coleman (American football) (born 1950), American football player
- Steve Collins (born 1964), Irish former professional boxer
- Steve Comisar (born 1961), American convicted con man and extortionist
- Steve Conway (politician) (born 1944), American politician
- Steve Conway (singer) (1920–1952), British singer
- Steve Condos (1918–1990), American tap dancer
- Steve Coogan (born 1965), English actor, comedian, producer and screenwriter
- Steve Cooley (born 1947), American lawyer, politician, and former prosecutor
- Steve Cooney, Australian-Irish musician
- Steve Corino (born 1973), Canadian semi-retired professional wrestler
- Steve Coulter, NASCAR team owner
- Steve Cox (disambiguation), several people
- Steve Cropper (1941–2025), American R&B guitarist and songwriter
- Steve Dangle (born 1988), Canadian sports analyst, author, and internet political and hockey personality
- Steve Davis (born 1957), British snooker player
- Steve Dee, American disc jockey and innovator
- Steve Deere, (born 1948), English footballer
- Steve DeMarco (born 1974), American professional wrestler
- Steve DiSalvo (born 1949), American retired professional wrestler
- Steve Doll (1960–2009), American professional wrestler
- Steve Doocy (born 1956), American television host, political commentator, and author
- Steve Dorff (born 1949), American songwriter and composer
- Steve Dubbeldam, Canadian-American entrepreneur and fashion designer
- Steve Dubinsky (born 1970), Canadian hockey player
- Steve Dublanica (born 1968), American author and blogger
- Steve Duemig (1954–2019), American sports media personality
- Steve Dunleavy (1938–2019), Australian journalist

=== E–M ===
- Steve Earle (born 1955), American singer-songwriter, record producer, author, and actor
- Steve Earle (footballer) (born 1945), English former footballer
- Steve Edge (born 1972), English actor, writer, and comedian
- Steve Edwards (disambiguation), multiple people
- Steve Erdman (born 1949), American politician
- Steve England, British radio producer and disc-jockey
- Steve Erickson (born 1950), American novelist
- Steve Evans (disambiguation), several people
- Steve Evets (born 1959), English actor and musician
- Steve Fainaru (born 1962), American journalist
- Steve Ferguson (disambiguation), several people
- Steve Ferrone (born 1950), English drummer and radio host
- Steve Fifita (born 1982), American former football defensive tackle
- Steve Filipowicz (1921–1975), American football and baseball player
- Steve Fisk, American audio engineer, record producer, and musician
- Steve Foley (disambiguation), several people
- Steve Fonyo (1965–2022), Canadian runner
- Steve Forbert (born 1954), American musician
- Steve Forrest (disambiguation), several people
- Steve Fossett (1944–2007), American businessman
- Steve Fox (disambiguation), several people
- Steve Fox (actor) (1966–1997), American actor and model
- Steve Fulmer (born 1966), Australian rugby league footballer
- Steve Gallardo (born 1968), American politician
- Steve Galluccio (born 1960), Canadian screenwriter and playwright
- Steve Garvey (disambiguation), several people
- Steve Gatorwolf (1957–2017), American professional wrestler
- Steve Gawley (born 1952), special effects artist and voice actor
- Steve George (disambiguation), several people
- Steve Gibson (disambiguation), several people
- Steve Gilliard (1964–2007), American journalist and blogger
- Steve Diet Goedde (born 1965), American photographer
- Steve Gohouri (1981–2015), Ivorian professional footballer
- Steve Golin (1955–2019), American film and television producer
- Steve Gomer, American film and television director
- Steve Gonsalves (born 1975), American producer and actor
- Steve Gonzalez (American football) (born 1981), American football player
- Steve Goodman (1948–1984), American folk and country singer-songwriter
- Steve Gordon, American screenwriter and film director (Arthur)
- Steve Gorman (born 1965), American musician and radio host
- Steve Gottlieb (disambiguation), several people
- Steve Grand (born 1990), American singer, songwriter and model
- Steve Grand (roboticist) (born 1958), British computer scientist and roboticist
- Steve or Steven Gray (disambiguation), several people
- Steve Griffin (born 1964), American football player
- Steve Guttenberg (born 1958), American actor, author, businessman, producer, and director
- Steve Halloran (born 1948), American politician
- Steve Hadley (disambiguation), several people
- Steve Hamerdinger, American deaf professional and advocate
- Steve Handelsman (born 1948), American journalist
- Steve Harley (1951–2024), British singer and songwriter, lead singer of Cockney Rebel
- Steve Harris (disambiguation), several people
- Steve Harvey (born 1957), American TV and radio personality
- Steve Harwell (1967–2023), American singer and musician
- Steve Haworth, body modification artist
- Steve Hearon (born 1953), American boxer
- Steve Hely, American writer and actor
- Steve High, American former women's basketball coach
- Steve Hockensmith (born 1968), American author
- Steve Hoffman (disambiguation), several people
- Steve Holt (American musician), guitarist for the band 36 Crazyfists
- Steve Holt (Canadian musician) (born 1954), Canadian musician
- Steve Holy (born 1972), American country music singer
- Steve Howe (baseball) (1958–2006), American baseball player
- Steve Howe (musician) (born 1947), English guitarist
- Steve Huebert (born 1959), Kansas state legislator
- Steve Hughes, Australian-born drummer, comedian and actor
- Steve Huison (born 1962), British actor
- Steve "Silk" Hurley (born 1962), American club DJ, producer, and songwriter
- Steve Ishmael (born 1995), American football player
- Steve Israel (American football) (born 1969), American former football cornerback
- Steve Israel (born 1958), American political commentator, lobbyist, author, bookseller and former politician
- Steve Irwin (disambiguation), several people
- Steve Jackson (disambiguation), several people
- Steve Jang, Northern Mariana Islander politician
- Steve Jarratt, British journalist and magazine editor
- Steve Jobs (1955–2011), American entrepreneur and co-founder of Apple Inc
- Steve Johnson (disambiguation), several people
- Steve Jolliffe (born 1949), English musician
- Steve Jolley (born 1975), American retired soccer player
- Steve Jones (disambiguation), several people
- Steve Jordan (disambiguation), several people
- Steve Julian (1958–2016), American radio broadcaster, actor, and playwright
- Steve Kangas (1961–1999), American journalist, political activist, and chess teacher
- Steve Kaplan, several people
- Steve Kazee (born 1975), American actor and singer
- Steve Kearns (born 1956), Canadian football player
- Steve Keirn (born 1951), American retired professional wrestler
- Steve Kekana (1958–2021), South African singer/songwriter
- Steve Kelley (disambiguation), several people
- Steve Kenyon (born 1951), English long-distance runner
- Steve Kinney (born 1949), American football player
- Steve King (born 1949), American politician and businessman
- Steve Kirby (cricketer), English cricketer
- Steve T. Kirby (born 1952), Lieutenant Governor of South Dakota
- Steven Klein (disambiguation), several people
- Steve Knapp (born 1964), American IndyCar driver
- Steve Komphela (born 1967), South African association footballer
- Steve Koren, American writer/producer and screenwriter
- Steve Kouplen (born 1951), American politician
- Steve Kowit (1938–2015), American poet, essayist, educator, and human-rights advocate
- Steve Krisiloff (born 1946), American racing driver
- Steve Krulevitz (born 1951), American tennis player
- Steve Kubby (1946–2022), Libertarian Party activist
- Steve Kuhn (born 1938), American pianist, composer, arranger, bandleader, and educator
- Steve Lamb (born 1955), English former footballer
- Steve Lacy (disambiguation), several people
- Steve Landesberg (1936–2010), American actor and comedian
- Steve J. Langdon (born 1948), American anthropologist
- Steve Largent (born 1954), American football player and politician
- Steve Lawler (wrestler) (1965–2021), American wrestler and trainer
- Steve Lekoelea (born 1979), South African association footballer
- Steve Lemmens (1972–2016), Belgian snooker player
- Steve Leialoha (born 1952), American comics artist
- Steve Leung (born 1957), Hong Kong architect and designer
- Steve LeVine (born 1957), American journalist
- Steve Levine, British record producer
- Steve Levy (born 1965), American sports broadcaster and journalist
- Steve Lieber (born 1967), American comic book illustrator
- Steve Light (born 1970), author and illustrator of children's books
- Steve Lightfoot, a British television writer and producer
- Steve Lightle (1959–2021), American comics artist
- Steve Lillebuen, Canadian author, journalist, and educator
- Steve Linton (born 2000), American football player
- Steve Little (disambiguation), several people
- Steve Lombardi (born 1961), American professional wrestler
- Steve Long (died 1868), American law enforcement officer and outlaw
- Steve Long (soccer) (born 1957), retired Zaire/U.S. soccer player
- Steve Longa (born 1994), American football player
- Steve Lukather (born 1957), American guitarist, singer, songwriter, arranger and record producer
- Steve Lyons (writer), British writer
- Steve Lyons (baseball) (born 1960), American baseball player and announcer/analyst
- Steve MacGordon (1892–1916), American early aviator
- Steve Mackay (1949–2015), American musician
- Steve Mackall (born 1959), Canadian and American voice actor
- Steve Madden (born 1958), American fashion designer and businessman, founder and CEO of Steve Madden Ltd
- Steve Madere, American business executive
- Steve Malovic (1956–2007), American-Israeli basketball player
- Steve Mandanda (born 1985), French footballer
- Steve Mantis (born 1950), Canadian advocate
- Steve March (born 1946), American politician and auditor
- Steve Marcus (1939–2005), American jazz saxophonist
- Steve Mark (1966–2016), Grenadian international footballer
- Steve Marker (born 1959), American musician, songwriter, and record producer
- Steve Markle, Canadian filmmaker, actor, writer, editor, and producer
- Steve Marmel (born 1964), American television writer, producer, and stand-up comedian
- Steve Marmion, English theatre director
- Steve Marriner (born 1984), Canadian musician, singer, songwriter, and record producer
- Steve Marshall (disambiguation), several people
- Steve Martin (born 1945), American comedian
- Steve Mason (disambiguation), several people
- Steve Matai (born 1984), New Zealand rugby player
- Steve Mazan (born 1970), American stand-up comedian, TV writer, and author
- Steve McClure (climber) (born 1970), British rock climber and climbing author
- Steve McCurry (born 1950), American photographer, freelancer, and photojournalist
- Steve McCutcheon (born 1972), British record producer, songwriter, and musician
- Steve McDonald (disambiguation), several people
- Steve McMichael (1957–2025), American former professional football player, sports broadcaster, and professional wrestler
- Steve McMillan (politician) (1941–2022), American politician and real estate broker
- Steve McNicholas (born 1955), English director, composer, actor, and dance group founder
- Steve McQueen (1930–1980), American actor
- Steve McQueen (born 1969), British filmmaker
- Steve Miller (disambiguation), several people
- Steve Miner (born 1951), American director of film and television, and film producer
- Steve Moore (disambiguation), several people

=== N–Z ===
- Steve Nash (born 1974), Canadian basketball coach and player
- Steve Nemeth (born 1967), Canadian ice hockey player
- Steve Nemeth (gridiron football) (1922–1998), American football player
- Steve Nguyen (born 1985), Vietnamese-American director, writer, artist, and film producer
- Steve Nickles, American lawyer and professor
- Steve Novick (born 1963), American politician, attorney, and activist
- Steve O'Donnell (disambiguation), several people
- Steve O'Rourke (1940–2003), British manager of Pink Floyd
- Steve O'Rourke (ice hockey) (born 1974), Canadian ice hockey coach
- Steve Olsonoski (born 1953), American professional wrestler
- Steve Orlando, American comic book writer
- Steve Ostrow (1932–2024), American businessman, LGBT rights activist, and opera performer
- Steve Osunsami, Nigerian-American journalist
- Steve Owen (disambiguation), several people
- Steve Owens (disambiguation), several people
- Steve Parker (disambiguation), several people
- Steve Patterson (disambiguation), several people
- Steve Pepoon, television writer
- Steve Perry (disambiguation), several people
- Steve Perryman (born 1951), English former professional footballer
- Steve Peterson (disambiguation), several people
- Steve Pfeifer (born 1938), American racing driver
- Steve Pierce (born 1950), American state politician
- Steve Pink (born 1966), American actor, director and writer
- Steve Pool (1953–2023), American weather broadcaster, journalist, and author
- Steve Porcaro (born 1957), American keyboardist, songwriter, singer, and film composer
- Steve Porter (disambiguation), several people
- Steve Post (1944–2014), American radio host
- Steve Rackman, English-born Australian actor and professional wrestler
- Steve Rash, American film director and producer
- Steve Reeves (1926–2000), American professional bodybuilder, actor, and philanthropist
- Steve Reeves (computer scientist), English computer scientist based at the University of Waikato in New Zealand
- Steve Reinke (born 1963), Canadian video artist and filmmaker
- Steve Ricchetti (born c. 1957), American political aide
- Steve Rifkind (born 1962), American music entrepreneur and investor
- Steve Rizzono, American former professional wrestler
- Steve Robinson (disambiguation), several people
- Steve Rodehutskors (1963–2007), Canadian football player
- Steve Rohr, American communication expert, educator, public relations executive, and author
- Steve Rubel, American public relations executive and blogger
- Steve Rubell (1943–1989), American nightclub owner, former co-owner of Studio 54
- Steve Russell (disambiguation), several people
- Steve Ryan (disambiguation), several people
- Steve Sailer (born 1958), American paleoconservative journalist, movie critic, blogger, and columnist
- Steve Sanders (disambiguation), several people
- Steve Sandor (1937–2017), American actor
- Steve Sarossy, British actor
- Steve Sawyer (disambiguation), several people
- Steve Sarowitz (born 1965/1966), American billionaire, founder of Paylocity
- Steve Scalise (born 1965), American Congressman
- Steve Schlachter (born 1954), American-Israeli basketball player
- Steve Sem-Sandberg (born 1958), Swedish journalist, novelist, non-fiction writer and translator
- Steve Serio (born 1987), American wheelchair basketball player
- Steve Sheldon, American politician
- Steve Shelton (born 1949), American racing driver
- Steve Shenbaum, American former actor
- Steve Shutt (born 1952), Canadian former professional ice hockey player and NHL Hall of Famer
- Steve Shields (disambiguation), several people
- Steve Silberman, American author and editor
- Steve Skeates (1943–2023), American comic book creator
- Steve or Steven Smith (disambiguation), several people
- Steve Smoger (1950–2022), American boxing & kickboxing referee
- Steve Soffa, American jewelry designer
- Steve Sohmer (born 1941), American media executive, writer, producer, and literary scholar
- Steve Brantley Spence (born 1989), American football player and federal convict
- Steve Squyres (born 1957), American astronomer
- Steve Steen (born 1954), British actor and comedian
- Steve Stenger, Democrat politician and County Executive of St. Louis County
- Steve Stevaert (1954–2015), Belgian politician
- Steve Stevens (born 1959), American guitarist
- Steve Stivers (born 1965), American Congressman
- Steve Stone (disambiguation), several people
- Steve Swaja, American dragster designer
- Steve Swallow (born 1940), American musician and composer
- Steve Swindal, American businessman
- Steve Swindall (born 1982), Scottish rugby player
- Steve Swindells (born 1952), English singer-songwriter
- Steve Talley (born 1981), American actor
- Steve Tannen (born 1968), American singer-songwriter
- Steve Tannen (American football) (born 1948), American former college and professional football player
- Steve Tarvin (born 1951), American politician
- Steve Tasker (born 1962), American sports reporter
- Steve Travis (born 1951), American retired singer-songwriter, musician, recording artist and author
- Steve Trilling (1902–1964), American film studio producer and executive
- Steve Tshwete (1938–2001), South African politician
- Steve Tully (born 1980), English footballer
- Steve Turner (born 1946), American professional tennis player and tennis coach
- Steve Vai (born 1960), American guitarist, composer, songwriter, and producer
- Steve Vaus, American recording artist and politician
- Steve Valentine (born 1966), Scottish actor and magician
- Steve Veidor (born 1938), British former heavyweight professional wrestler
- Steve Wall, (fl. 1980s – ), Irish actor and musician
- Steve Walsh (disambiguation), several people
- Steve Weisberg (born 1963), American composer, pianist, recording artist, and producer
- Steve Weissman, American sportscaster
- Steve White (disambiguation), several people
- Steve Whitmire (born 1959), American puppeteer
- Steve Wilkos (born 1964), American talk-show host
- Steve Williams (disambiguation), several people
- Steve Wilson (disambiguation), multiple people
- Steve Winn (born 1981), Welsh rugby union player
- Steve Winwood (born 1948), English singer
- Steve Witting, American actor
- Steve Woodmore (born 1959), British electronics salesman
- Steve Wozniak (born 1950), American co-founder of Apple Inc
- Steve Wray (1962–2009), Bahamian former athlete
- Steve Wynn (musician) (born 1960), American singer, musician and songwriter
- Steve Yeager (born 1948), American baseball player
- Steve Young (born 1961), American football player
- Steve Yzerman (born 1965), Canadian former professional ice hockey player and NHL Hall of Famer
- Steve Zatylny, Canadian football player
- Steve Zuckerman (born 1947), American television and theater director

== In fiction ==
- Steve, one of the main protagonists and default player characters in the game Minecraft
- Steve Austin, a man barely alive in Six Million Dollar Man
- Steve Fox, a character from the Tekken fighting game series
- Steve Harrington, in the Netflix series Stranger Things
- Steve Holt (Arrested Development), in the Fox TV series Arrested Development
- Steve Johnson (Days of Our Lives), in the American soap opera Days of Our Lives
- Steve McDonald, in the British soap opera Coronation Street
- Steve McGarrett, a character from the television series Hawaii Five-O
- Steve Owen (EastEnders), on the British soap opera EastEnders
- Steve Randle, a character from the 1983 film The Outsiders
- Steve Rogers, the civilian alias of Captain America
- Steve Sanders, in the TV series Beverly Hills, 90210
- Steve Stifler, a character from the American Pie series
- Steve Trevor, in the DC Comics and 1970s television series Wonder Woman
- Steve Urkel, in the TV series Family Matters
- Steve Zissou, a character from the 2004 film The Life Aquatic with Steve Zissou
- Steve, a character from Mewgenics

== See also ==
- List of people with given name Stephen
- Stephen (disambiguation)
- Steeve, given name
- Stevie (given name)
