= Stephen Kelly =

Stephen Kelly may refer to:

- Stephen Kelly (footballer, born 1983), Irish footballer
- Stephen Kelly (Scottish footballer) (born 2000), Scottish footballer for Rangers, Ross County, Salford, Livingston
- Stephen Kelly (Wicklow Gaelic footballer) (born 1987), Gaelic footballer for Wicklow
- Stephen Kelly (Limerick Gaelic footballer), Gaelic footballer for Limerick
- Stephen Kelly (canoeist) (born 1944), American sprint canoer
- Stephen F. Kelly (born 1946), English author and broadcaster
- Stephen Kelly (businessman) (born 1961), English software executive
- Stephen A. Kelly (1833–1910), Irish-American Catholic priest and Jesuit
- Stephen Kelly (field hockey), Welsh field hockey player

== See also ==
- Steve Kelley (disambiguation)
- Steve Kelly (disambiguation), includes Steven
