= Steven Gray =

Steve, Stephen or Steven Gray may refer to:

== Sports ==
- Steve Gray (basketball), American basketball player for Saint Mary's College
- Steven Gray (basketball, born 1989), American
- Steve Gray (racing driver) (born 1956), retired NASCAR Cup Series driver
- Steve Gray (rugby union) (born 1963), Canadian rugby union player
- Steven Gray (footballer) (born 1981), Irish footballer
- Stevie Gray (1967–2009), Scottish footballer
- Stephen Gray (cricketer) (born 1988), English cricketer

== Other ==
- Stephen Grey (born 1968), British journalist
- Stephen Gray (scientist) (1666–1736), English scientist
- Stephen Gray (musical administrator) (1923–2012), English musical administrator
- Stephen Gray (writer) (1941–2020), South African writer
- Steve Gray (musician) (1944–2008), English pianist, composer, and arranger
- Steve Gray (TV presenter) (born 1965), New Zealand TV presenter and blogger
- Steven Gray (American journalist), American writer, editor, and producer
- Steven Gray (professor), American environmental social scientist, environmental psychologist, and professor
- Adyashanti (Steven Gray, born 1962), American spiritual teacher
