= 2000–01 Wolverhampton Wanderers F.C. season =

English football club season

Wolverhampton Wanderers
2000–01 season
- Chairman: Sir Jack Hayward OBE
- Manager: Colin Lee (until 18 December); Dave Jones (from 3 January)
- First Division: 12th
- FA Cup: 4th round
- League Cup: 3rd round
- Top goalscorer: League: Adam Proudlock (8); All: Adam Proudlock (11)
- Highest home attendance: 26,627 (vs Gillingham, 3 February 2001)
- Lowest home attendance: 8,058 (vs Grimsby, 2 October 2000)
- Average home league attendance: 19,258 (league only)

The 2000–01 season was the 102nd season of competitive league football in the history of English football club Wolverhampton Wanderers. They played the season in the second tier of the English football system, the Football League First Division.

The team finished in 12th position, their lowest league finish for five seasons. Colin Lee began the season as manager but was sacked in December 2000 with the team just a single point clear of the relegation zone. Former Southampton manager Dave Jones replaced him in early January but could not take the side any higher than mid-table.

== Results ==
=== Pre-season ===
Wolves' pre season saw them travel to Ireland to play three local sides. They then returned home to play three Premiership teams at Molineux; the fixture against Aston Villa was a testimonial match for Mike Stowell.

17 July 2000	Waterford United	0–2	Wolverhampton Wanderers	Waterford, Ireland
			Robinson 76'; Epesse-Titi 85'	Stadium: Regional Sports Centre; Attendance: 2,211; Referee: Richard O'Hanlon

19 July 2000	Cork City	0–0	Wolverhampton Wanderers	Cork, Ireland
				Stadium: Turners Cross; Attendance: 3,500; Referee: Alan Kelly

21 July 2000	Kilkenny City	0–2	Wolverhampton Wanderers	Kilkenny, Ireland
			Robinson 15'; Branch 89'	Stadium: Buckley Park; Attendance: 2,200; Referee: J O'Neill

26 July 2000	Wolverhampton Wanderers	0–1	Coventry City	Wolverhampton
			Keane 61'	Stadium: Molineux; Attendance: 4,800; Referee: Andy Hall

30 July 2000	Wolverhampton Wanderers	0–2	Aston Villa	Wolverhampton
			Taylor 18'; Hendrie 66'	Stadium: Molineux; Attendance: 11,351; Referee: Paul Rejer

5 August 2000	Wolverhampton Wanderers	1–2	Southampton	Wolverhampton
	Sinton 4'		Pahars 19'; Kachloul 54'	Stadium: Molineux; Attendance: 4,680; Referee: Mick Fletcher

=== Football League First Division ===
A total of 24 teams competed in the Football League First Division in the 2000–01 season. Each team played every other team twice: once at their stadium, and once at the opposition's. Three points were awarded to teams for each win, one point per draw, and none for defeats.

The provisional fixture list was released on 22 June 2000, but was subject to change in the event of matches being selected for television coverage or police concerns.

13 August 2000 1	Wolverhampton Wanderers	1–1	Sheffield Wednesday	Wolverhampton
12:30 GMT	Ketsbaia 18'	Report	Booth 79'	Stadium: Molineux; Attendance: 19,086 (1,969 away fans); Referee: Mark Halsey

19 August 2000 2	Stockport County	1–1	Wolverhampton Wanderers	Stockport
15:00 BST	Moore 55'	Report	Bazeley 71'	Stadium: Edgeley Park; Attendance: 7,758 (2,146 away fans); Referee: Mark Cowburn

26 August 2000 3	Wolverhampton Wanderers	1–0	Burnley	Wolverhampton
15:00 BST	Sedgley 74'	Report		Stadium: Molineux; Attendance: 20,156 (2,682 away fans); Referee: Mike Jones

28 August 2000 4	Portsmouth	3–1	Wolverhampton Wanderers	Portsmouth
15:00 BST	Claridge 2', 30', 32' (pen.)	Report	Ketsbaia 45'	Stadium: Fratton Park; Attendance: 14,124 (1,586 away fans); Referee: Andy Butler

2 September 2000 5	Gillingham	1–0	Wolverhampton Wanderers	Gillingham
15:00 BST	Lewis 4'	Report		Stadium: Priestfield; Attendance: 10,017 (1,531 away fans); Referee: Paul Durkin

9 September 2000 6	Wolverhampton Wanderers	1–2	Tranmere Rovers	Wolverhampton
15:00 BST	Robinson 12'	Report	Allison 43'; Barlow 83' (pen.)	Stadium: Molineux; Attendance: 17,252 (806 away fans); Referee: Steve Lodge

12 September 2000 7	Wolverhampton Wanderers	0–0	Sheffield United	Wolverhampton
19:45 BST		Report		Stadium: Molineux; Attendance: 14,853 (677 away fans); Referee: George Cain

16 September 2000 8	Wimbledon	1–1	Wolverhampton Wanderers	London
15:00 BST	Hartson 58'	Report	Lescott 79'	Stadium: Selhurst Park; Attendance: 8,761 (1,786 away fans); Referee: Peter Walton

24 September 2000 9	Wolverhampton Wanderers	4–0	Norwich City	Wolverhampton
13:00 BST	Proudlock 21'; Dinning 26'; Robinson 45'; Branch 70'	Report		Stadium: Molineux; Attendance: 15,105 (473 away fans); Referee: Scott Mathieson

30 September 2000 10	Nottingham Forest	0–0	Wolverhampton Wanderers	Nottingham
15:00 BST		Report		Stadium: City Ground; Attendance: 19,110 (1,743 away fans); Referee: Roger Furnandiz

14 October 2000 11	Bolton Wanderers	2–1	Wolverhampton Wanderers	Bolton
15:00 BST	Holdsworth 28'; Bergsson 68'	Report	Dinning 53' (pen.)	Stadium: Reebok Stadium; Attendance: 15,585 (1,053 away fans); Referee: Roy Pearson

17 October 2000 12	West Bromwich Albion	1–0	Wolverhampton Wanderers	West Bromwich
20:00 BST	Hughes 19' (pen.)	Report		Stadium: The Hawthorns; Attendance: 21,492 (5,162 away fans); Referee: Clive Wilkes

21 October 2000 13	Wolverhampton Wanderers	0–0	Fulham	Wolverhampton
15:00 BST		Report		Stadium: Molineux; Attendance: 21,080 (1,437 away fans); Referee: Graham Laws

24 October 2000 14	Barnsley	1–2	Wolverhampton Wanderers	Barnsley
19:45 BST	McClare 8'	Report	Muscat 18'; Ketsbaia 45'	Stadium: Oakwell; Attendance: 13,393 (508 away fans); Referee: Jeff Winter

28 October 2000 15	Wolverhampton Wanderers	2–2	Watford	Wolverhampton
15:00 BST	Muscat 47' (pen.); Dinning 75'	Report	Cox 33'; Mooney 39'	Stadium: Molineux; Attendance: 20,296 (1,613 away fans); Referee: William Burns

4 November 2000 16	Crewe Alexandra	2–0	Wolverhampton Wanderers	Crewe
15:00 GMT	Cramb 27', 45'	Report		Stadium: Gresty Road; Attendance: 7,147 (1,454 away fans); Referee: Jeff Winter

11 November 2000 17	Wolverhampton Wanderers	1–3	Crystal Palace	Wolverhampton
15:00 GMT	Branch 60'	Report	Freedman 23'; Morrison 45', 72'	Stadium: Molineux; Attendance: 17,658 (820 away fans); Referee: Neale Barry

18 November 2000 18	Blackburn Rovers	1–0	Wolverhampton Wanderers	Blackburn
15:00 GMT	Dunn 64' (pen.)	Report		Stadium: Ewood Park; Attendance: 20,380 (2,127 away fans); Referee: Graham Frankland

21 November 2000 19	Wolverhampton Wanderers	2–0	Grimsby Town	Wolverhampton
19:45 GMT	Dinning 6'; Ndah 45'	Report		Stadium: Molineux; Attendance: 16,088 (382 away fans); Referee: Rob Harris

25 November 2000 20	Queens Park Rangers	2–2	Wolverhampton Wanderers	London
15:00 GMT	Peacock (penalty missed) 38' 38', 86'	Report	Ndah 19'; Pollet 43'	Stadium: Loftus Road; Attendance: 11,156 (1,036 away fans); Referee: Lee Cable

2 December 2000 21	Wolverhampton Wanderers	2–0	Barnsley	Wolverhampton
15:00 GMT	Robinson 28'; Dinning 59'	Report		Stadium: Molineux; Attendance: 17,340 (398 away fans); Referee: Chris Foy

9 December 2000 22	Huddersfield Town	3–0	Wolverhampton Wanderers	Huddersfield
15:00 GMT	Ndlovu 49', 90'; Facey 86'	Report		Stadium: McAlpine Stadium; Attendance: 11,506 (1,488 away fans); Referee: Paul Danson

17 December 2000 23	Wolverhampton Wanderers	0–1	Birmingham City	Wolverhampton
13:00 GMT		Report	Adebola 32'	Stadium: Molineux; Attendance: 19,938 (2,180 away fans); Referee: Graham Laws

23 December 2000 24	Sheffield Wednesday	0–1	Wolverhampton Wanderers	Sheffield
15:00 GMT		Report	Muscat 45'	Stadium: Hillsborough; Attendance: 17,787 (883 away fans); Referee: Roy Pearson

26 December 2000 25	Wolverhampton Wanderers	0–1	Preston North End	Wolverhampton
15:00 GMT		Report	Anderson 14'	Stadium: Molineux; Attendance: 24,306 (1,839 away fans); Referee: Bill Jordan

30 December 2000 26	Wolverhampton Wanderers	3–2	Stockport County	Wolverhampton
15:00 GMT	Proudlock 22'; Wiss 32' (o.g.); Branch 45'	Report	Nicholson 45' (pen.); Wiss 90'	Stadium: Molineux; Attendance: 16,667 (488 away fans); Referee: Mike Ryan

1 January 2001 27	Burnley	1–2	Wolverhampton Wanderers	Burnley
13:00 GMT	Branch 9'	Report	Proudlock 28'; Naylor 85'	Stadium: Turf Moor; Attendance: 15,483 (1,127 away fans); Referee: Roger Furnandiz

13 January 2001 28	Wolverhampton Wanderers	1–1	Portsmouth	Wolverhampton
15:00 GMT	Sinton 20'; Muscat (penalty missed) 88'	Report	Lescott 27' (o.g.)	Stadium: Molineux; Attendance: 20,869 (1,325 away fans); Referee: Barry Curson

3 February 2001 29	Wolverhampton Wanderers	1–1	Gillingham	Wolverhampton
15:00 GMT	Branch 45'	Report	King 26'	Stadium: Molineux; Attendance: 26,627 (1,476 away fans); Referee: Richard Beeby

10 February 2001 30	Tranmere Rovers	0–2	Wolverhampton Wanderers	Birkenhead
15:00 GMT		Report	Flynn 21' (o.g.); Proudlock 47'	Stadium: Prenton Park; Attendance: 9,678 (2,051 away fans); Referee: Keith Hill

20 February 2001 31	Sheffield United	1–0	Wolverhampton Wanderers	Sheffield
20:00 BST	D'Jaffo 21'	Report	Muscat (penalty missed) 63'	Stadium: Bramall Lane; Attendance: 20,282 (1,144 away fans); Referee: Scott Mathieson

24 February 2001 32	Norwich City	1–0	Wolverhampton Wanderers	Norwich
15:00 GMT	McVeigh 3'	Report		Stadium: Carrow Road; Attendance: 17,288 (903 away fans); Referee: Peter Jones

3 March 2001 33	Wolverhampton Wanderers	2–0	Nottingham Forest	Wolverhampton
15:00 GMT	Edds 48' (o.g.); Proudlock 62'	Report		Stadium: Molineux; Attendance: 20,291 (1,944 away fans); Referee: Phil Richards

10 March 2001 34	Grimsby Town	0–2	Wolverhampton Wanderers	Cleethorpes
15:00 GMT		Report	Dinning 66'; Proudlock 83'	Stadium: Blundell Park; Attendance: 4,899 (1,260 away fans); Referee: Mike Dean

14 March 2001 35	Preston North End	2–0	Wolverhampton Wanderers	Preston
19:45 GMT	McKenna 43'; Cresswell 78'	Report		Stadium: Deepdale; Attendance: 15,457 (922 away fans); Referee: Scott Mathieson

18 March 2001 36	Wolverhampton Wanderers	3–1	West Bromwich Albion	Wolverhampton
13:00 GMT	Ndah 23', 45'; Pollet 66'	Report	Clement 82'	Stadium: Molineux; Attendance: 25,069 (3,198 away fans); Referee: Uriah Rennie

1 April 2001 37	Birmingham City	0–1	Wolverhampton Wanderers	Birmingham
13:00 BST		Report	Ndah 1'	Stadium: St Andrew's; Attendance: 24,003 (2,104 away fans); Referee: Frazer Stretton

4 April 2001 38	Wolverhampton Wanderers	0–1	Wimbledon	Wolverhampton
19:45 BST		Report	Ardley 53'	Stadium: Molineux; Attendance: 16,767 (168 away fans); Referee: Mark Cowburn

7 April 2001 39	Wolverhampton Wanderers	0–1	Huddersfield Town	Wolverhampton
15:00 BST		Report	Facey 10'	Stadium: Molineux; Attendance: 19,423 (1,185 away fans); Referee: Graham Frankland

14 April 2001 40	Wolverhampton Wanderers	0–0	Crewe Alexandra	Wolverhampton
15:00 BST		Report		Stadium: Molineux; Attendance: 20,364 (814 away fans); Referee: Graham Laws

17 April 2001 41	Watford	3–2	Wolverhampton Wanderers	Watford
19:45 BST	Mooney 8'; Smith 14'; Helguson 90'	Report	Ndah 44' (pen.); Proudlock 80'	Stadium: Vicarage Road; Attendance: 13,765 (1,321 away fans); Referee: Mike Jones

21 April 2001 42	Wolverhampton Wanderers	0–0	Blackburn Rovers	Wolverhampton
15:00 BST		Report		Stadium: Molineux; Attendance: 20,018 (2,381 away fans); Referee: Paul Danson

24 April 2001 43	Fulham	2–0	Wolverhampton Wanderers	London
19:45 BST	Saha 23' (pen.), 70' (pen.)	Report		Stadium: Craven Cottage; Attendance: 15,375 (447 away fans); Referee: Tony Leake

28 April 2001 44	Crystal Palace	0–2	Wolverhampton Wanderers	London
15:00 BST		Report	Sinton 16'; Proudlock 49'	Stadium: Selhurst Park; Attendance: 18,993 (1,690 away fans); Referee: Mike Ryan

1 May 2001 45	Wolverhampton Wanderers	0–2	Bolton Wanderers	Wolverhampton
19:45 BST		Report	Holdsworth 20'; Ricketts 70'	Stadium: Molineux; Attendance: 16,242 (510 away fans); Referee: David Elleray

6 May 2001 46	Wolverhampton Wanderers	1–1	Queens Park Rangers	Wolverhampton
13:30 BST	Lescott 36'	Report	Bruce 62'	Stadium: Molineux; Attendance: 17,447 (1,618 away fans); Referee: Steve Bennett

Final table

Pos	Team	Pld	W	D	L	GF	GA	GD	Pts
10	Sheffield United	46	19	11	16	52	49	+3	68
11	Nottingham Forest	46	20	8	18	55	53	+2	68
12	Wolverhampton Wanderers	46	14	13	19	45	48	–3	55
13	Gillingham	46	13	16	17	61	66	–5	55
14	Crewe Alexandra	46	15	10	21	47	62	–15	55
15	Norwich City	46	14	12	20	46	58	–12	54

Source: Statto.com

Results summary

Overall								Home						Away					
Pld	W	D	L	GF	GA	GD	Pts	W	D	L	GF	GA	GD	W	D	L	GF	GA	GD
46	14	13	19	45	48	−3	55	7	9	7	25	20	+5	7	4	12	20	28	−8

Source: Statto.com

Results by round

Round	1	2	3	4	5	6	7	8	9	10	11	12	13	14	15	16	17	18	19	20	21	22	23	24	25	26	27	28	29	30	31	32	33	34	35	36	37	38	39	40	41	42	43	44	45	46
Result	D	D	W	L	L	L	D	D	W	D	L	L	D	W	D	L	L	L	W	D	W	L	L	W	L	W	W	D	D	W	L	L	W	W	L	W	W	L	L	D	L	D	L	W	L	D
Position	9	13	8	15	17	19	16	18	13	15	16	16	17	15	14	18	20	21	15	16	14	15	16	15	17	14	12	12	13	12	14	15	14	13	13	13	13	13	13	14	14	15	16	12	12	12

Source: Statto.com
W = Win; D = Draw; L = Loss

=== FA Cup ===
7 January 2001 R3	Nottingham Forest	0–1	Wolverhampton Wanderers	Nottingham
15:00 GMT		Report	Proudlock 87'	Stadium: City Ground; Attendance: 14,601 (2,438 away fans); Referee: David Pugh

27 January 2001 R4	Wycombe Wanderers	2–1	Wolverhampton Wanderers	High Wycombe
15:00 GMT	Rammell 37'; Parkin 85'	Report	Robinson 59'	Stadium: Adams Park; Attendance: 9,617 (1,677 away fans); Referee: Paul Danson

=== League Cup ===
22 August 2000 R1.1	Wolverhampton Wanderers	0–1	Oxford United	Wolverhampton
19:45 BST		Report	Murphy 37'	Stadium: Molineux; Attendance: 9,399; Referee: Trevor Jones

5 September 2000 R1.2	Oxford United	1–3 (2–3 agg.)	Wolverhampton Wanderers	Oxford
19:45 BST	Shepheard 16'	Report	Robinson 51'; Taylor 65'; Proudlock 68'	Stadium: Manor Ground; Attendance: 4,679; Referee: Paul Alcock

26 September 2000 R2.1	Grimsby Town	3–2	Wolverhampton Wanderers	Cleethorpes
19:45 BST	Gallimore 12'; Rowan 81'; Allen 82'	Report	Taylor 6', 45'	Stadium: Blundell Park; Attendance: 2,396; Referee: Graham Laws

2 October 2000 R2.2	Wolverhampton Wanderers	2–0 (4–3 agg.)	Grimsby Town	Wolverhampton
19:45 BST	Proudlock 36'; Muscat 73' (pen.)	Report		Stadium: Molineux; Attendance: 8,058; Referee: David Crick

1 November 2000 R3	Fulham	3–2	Wolverhampton Wanderers	London
19:45 GMT	Boa Morte 67', 83'; Saha 85'	Report	Ketsbaia 60'; Osborn 90'	Stadium: Craven Cottage; Attendance: 6,763; Referee: Eddie Wolstenholme

== Players ==
=== Statistics ===
Key:
‡ On loan from another club * First appearance(s) for the club

- # = Squad number
- Pos = Playing position
- P = Number of games played
- G = Number of goals scored
- GK = Goalkeeper
- DF = Defender
- MF = Midfielder
- FW = Forward
- = Yellow cards
- = Red cards
- † Permanent player left club during the season
- ¤ Loaned to another club for part or all of season

Correct as of the season's end. Starting appearances are listed first, followed by substitute appearances in parentheses where applicable.

No.	Pos	Name	P	G	P	G	P	G	P	G	A yellow card	A red card	Notes
No.	Pos	Name	League		FA Cup		League Cup		Total		Discipline		Notes
1	GK	(England) Michael Oakes	46	0	1	0	4	0	51	0	0	0	
2	DF	(Australia) Kevin Muscat (c)	37	3	1	0	4	1	42	4	10	1	
3	DF	(England) Lee Naylor	44(2)	1	2	0	5	0	51(2)	1	4	0	
4	MF	(Wales) Carl Robinson	36(4)	3	2	1	4(1)	1	42(5)	5	4	0	
5	DF	(France) Ludovic Pollet	29	2	1	0	0	0	30	2	2	0	
6	MF	(England) Neil Emblen	21(7)	0	1(1)	0	4	0	26(8)	0	0	0	
7	DF	(England) Darren Bazeley	23(1)	1	0	0	5	0	28(1)	1	2	0	
8	MF	(England) Simon Osborn †	16(4)	0	2	0	2	0	20(4)	0	5	0	
8	DF	(England) Sean Connelly ‡	6	0	0	0	0	0	6	0	2	1	
9	FW	(Georgia (country)) Temuri Ketsbaia	14(8)	3	0	0	3(1)	1	17(9)	4	3	0	
10	FW	(England) Michael Branch	31(7)	4	2	0	2(1)	0	35(8)	4	9	0	
11	MF	(England) Andy Sinton	28(2)	2	2	0	2(1)	0	32(3)	2	4	0	
12	GK	(England) Mike Stowell	0(1)	0	1	0	1	0	2(1)	0	0	0	
14	FW	(Nigeria) George Ndah	23(6)	6	0(1)	0	0(1)	0	23(8)	6	6	0	
15	MF	(England) Steve Sedgley †	5	1	0	0	1(1)	0	6(1)	1	2	0	
15	FW	(Belgium) Cédric Roussel	3(6)	0	0	0	0	0	3(6)	0	0	0	
16	MF	(England) Scott Taylor	3(1)	0	0	0	2	0	5(1)	0	2	0	
17	FW	(England) Robert Taylor	5(4)	0	0	0	3	3	8(4)	3	1	0	
18	DF	(Wales) Ryan Green ¤	5(2)	0	0(2)	0	2	0	7(4)	0	2	1	
19	DF	(England) Joleon Lescott	31(6)	2	2	0	5	0	38(6)	2	3	1	
20	MF	(Republic of Ireland) Keith Andrews ¤	20(2)	0	2	0	0	0	22(2)	0	4	1	
21	FW	(Norway) Håvard Flo	0	0	0	0	0	0	0	0	0	0	
22	FW	(Republic of Ireland) Colin Larkin	0(2)	0	0	0	0	0	0(2)	0	0	0	
23	DF	(Guinea) Mo Camara ‡	4(14)	0	0(1)	0	1(1)	0	5(16)	0	0	0	
24	MF	(England) Tony Dinning	31	6	1	0	0	0	32	6	5	0	
25	DF	(Northern Ireland) Gordon Simms †	0	0	0	0	0	0	0	0	0	0	
26	FW	(Saudi Arabia) Sami Al-Jaber ‡	0(4)	0	0	0	1	0	1(4)	0	0	0	
27	DF	(France) Manuel Thetis ‡	3	0	0	0	0	0	3	0	0	0	
27	DF	(England) Darren Peacock ‡	2(2)	0	0	0	1	0	3(2)	0	0	0	
27	DF	(Republic of Ireland) Paul Butler ‡	12	0	0	0	0	0	12	0	2	0	
28	MF	(England) Shane Tudor	0(1)	0	0	0	0	0	0(1)	0	0	0	
29	DF	(France) Steeve Epesse-Titi †	0	0	0	0	0	0	0	0	0	0	
30	GK	(England) Matt Murray ¤	0	0	0	0	0	0	0	0	0	0	
31	FW	(England) Adam Proudlock ¤	28(7)	8	2	1	3(1)	2	33(8)	11	4	0	
32	MF	(Republic of Ireland) Seamus Crowe ¤	0	0	0	0	0	0	0	0	0	0	
33	DF	(Northern Ireland) Mark Clyde	0	0	0	0	0	0	0	0	0	0	
36	MF	(Republic of Ireland) John Melligan	0	0	0	0	0	0	0	0	0	0	
39	GK	(England) Lewis Solly	0	0	0	0	0	0	0	0	0	0	
40	GK	(Australia) Frank Talia †	0	0	0	0	0	0	0	0	0	0	
40	GK	(Northern Ireland) Aaron Kerr	0	0	0	0	0	0	0	0	0	0	
41	GK	(England) Carlo Nash ‡	0	0	0	0	0	0	0	0	0	0	

=== Awards ===
Award	Winner
Fans' Player of the Season	Lee Naylor
Young Player of the Season	Joleon Lescott

== Transfers ==
=== In ===
Date	Player	From	Fee
1 August 2000	(France) Steeve Epesse-Titi	Unattached	Free
4 August 2000	(Georgia (country)) Temuri Ketsbaia	Newcastle United	£900,000
11 August 2000	(Australia) Frank Talia	Unattached	Free
15 August 2000	(England) Robert Taylor	Manchester City	£1.55 million
21 September 2000	(England) Tony Dinning	Stockport County	£600,000
1 December 2000	(Guinea) Mo Camara	(France) Le Havre	£100,000
31 January 2001	(Republic of Ireland) Paul Butler	Sunderland	£1 million
15 February 2001	(Belgium) Cédric Roussel	Coventry City	£1.53 million

=== Out ===
Date	Player	To	Fee
21 June 2000	(Wales) Ady Williams	Reading	Free
30 June 2000	(England) Keith Curle	Sheffield United	Free
27 July 2000	(Nigeria) Ade Akinbiyi	Leicester City	£5 million
28 July 2000	(England) Mark Jones	Chesterfield	Free
11 August 2000	(England) Paul Simpson	Blackpool	Free
11 September 2000	(Australia) Frank Talia	Released	Free
11 December 2000	(England) Steve Sedgley	Released	Free
9 March 2001	(Northern Ireland) Gordon Simms	Hartlepool United	Free
22 March 2001	(France) Steeve Epesse-Titi	Exeter City	Free
22 March 2001	(England) Simon Osborn	Tranmere Rovers	Free

=== Loans in ===
Start date	Player	From	End date
1 August 2000	(Guinea) Mo Camara	(France) Le Havre	30 November 2000
22 August 2000	(Saudi Arabia) Sami Al-Jaber	(Saudi Arabia) Al-Hilal	22 January 2001
26 August 2000	(France) Manuel Thetis	Ipswich Town	13 September 2000
13 October 2000	(England) Darren Peacock	Blackburn Rovers	4 November 2000
17 November 2000	(Republic of Ireland) Paul Butler	Sunderland	17 December 2000
8 December 2000	(England) Carlo Nash	Stockport County	31 December 2000
22 March 2001	(England) Sean Connelly	Stockport County	End of season

=== Loans out ===
Start date	Player	To	End date
1 August 2000	(Germany) Robert Niestroj	(Greece) Iraklis	1 February 2001
1 August 2000	(England) Adam Proudlock	(Scotland) Clyde	5 September 2000
September 2000	(England) Matt Murray	Slough Town	September 2000
20 October 2000	(England) Matt Murray	Kingstonian	26 October 2000
10 November 2000	(Republic of Ireland) Keith Andrews	Oxford United	21 December 2000
1 March 2001	(Wales) Ryan Green	Torquay United	End of season
22 March 2001	(Republic of Ireland) Seamus Crowe	Hereford United	End of season

== Kit ==
The season saw the team return to their historic "old gold" shade of shirt for the first time since the 1950s. There was also a new away kit that was a light blue design. Both were now manufactured by the club's own label, entitled "WWFC", and sponsored by Goodyear.
