= Steve Kelly (disambiguation) =

Steve Kelly is an ice hockey player.

Steve or Steven Kelly may also refer to:

- Steve Kelly (Emmerdale), character in soap opera Emmerdale
- Steve Kelly (high jumper), national champion at the 1968 USA Indoor Track and Field Championships
- Steven Kelly (sailor) (born 1955), businessman and Olympic sailor
- Steven Kelly (politician), member of Montana House of Representatives
- Steven Kelly (sport shooter), Canadian Olympic sports shooter
- Steven Kelly (survivalist), British Survival instructor

== See also ==
- Stephen Kelly (disambiguation)
- Steve Kelley (disambiguation)
- Kelly (surname)
