= Impellizzeri =

Impellizzeri is an Italian surname. Notable people with the surname include:

- Brian Lionel Impellizzeri (born 1998) Argentine Paralympic athlete
- Charles Impellizzeri (died 1656), Italian Roman Catholic bishop
- Nunzio Impellizzeri (born 1980), Italian choreographer
- Shirley Impellizzeri, American clinical psychologist
- Simone Impellizzeri (died 1701), Italian Roman Catholic bishop
