= Steeven =

Steeven is a given name. Notable people with the name include:

- Steeven Joseph-Monrose (born 1990), French footballer
- Steeven Langil (born 1988), French footballer
- Steeven Petitteville (born 1974), French cinematographer
- Steeven Ribéry (born 1995), French footballer
- Steeven Saba (born 1993), Haitian footballer
- Steeven Willems (born 1990), French footballer

== See also ==
- Steeve
- Steevens
- Stephen
