= Stephen Cox =

Stephen Cox may refer to:

- Stephen Cox (cyclist) (born 1956), retired racing cyclist from New Zealand
- Stephen Cox (sculptor) (born 1946), British sculptor of stone
- Stephen Cox (American writer) (born 1966), American freelance writer and author
- Stephen Cox (British writer), British speculative and mystery fiction writer
- Stephen D. Cox (1948–2024), American editor of Liberty magazine
- Stephen J. Cox, Attorney General of Alaska and former US Attorney in Texas

== See also ==
- Steve Cox (disambiguation)
- Cox (surname)
