= Steve Soffa =

American jewelry designer

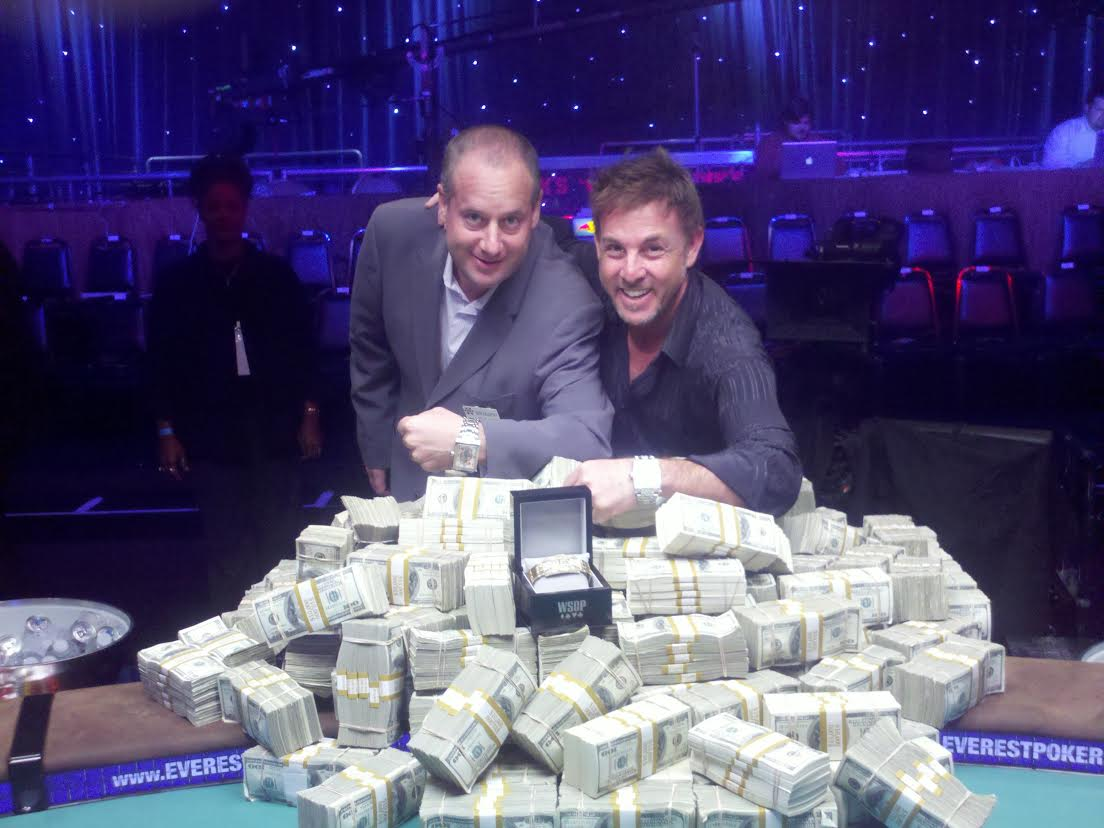
- Soffa (right) at 2010 WSOP event
- Born: Detroit, Michigan
- Occupations: Artist and Designer, founder of Hardcore Watch Co.
- Known for: 2010 World Series of Poker bracelet
- Website: stevesoffa.com

Steve Soffa is an American watch and jewelry designer and artist, known for his championship jewelry, collectible timepieces, and collaborations in the fields of art, motorsports, and entertainment. He is the founder of Hardcore Watch Company.

His commissions include the championship bracelets for the 2010 World Series of Poker, the 75th Anniversary Collection for the Sturgis Motorcycle Rally, and commemorative watches celebrating the heritage of Shelby American. He has also collaborated with American artist Scott Jacobs on a series of collectible timepieces incorporating original fine-art imagery.

== Career ==
Soffa began his career in the watch industry in 1993, working in the corporate-branded timepiece market. He subsequently joined a Los Angeles-based company, where he helped develop commemorative watch collections and programs for corporate clients.

His early work included custom timepieces produced for companies including Microsoft, Oracle, Intel and Universal Pictures.

On April 23, 2005, Soffa launched Hardcore Watch Company at the Laughlin River Run in Nevada. The company introduced original timepiece collections distinguished by sculptural dials, three-dimensional artwork, and designs influenced by motorcycle culture, playing cards, and mechanical art.

In 2008, he opened a retail location at the Rio All-Suite Hotel and Casino in Las Vegas, displaying his original watches, jewelry, and artwork.

His subsequent Hardcore Watch Company collections included Lost Skulls, Ace of Pain, and Twisted Love, featuring dimensional dial artwork, detailed decorative elements, and unconventional watch designs.

=== 2010 World Series of Poker championship bracelets ===
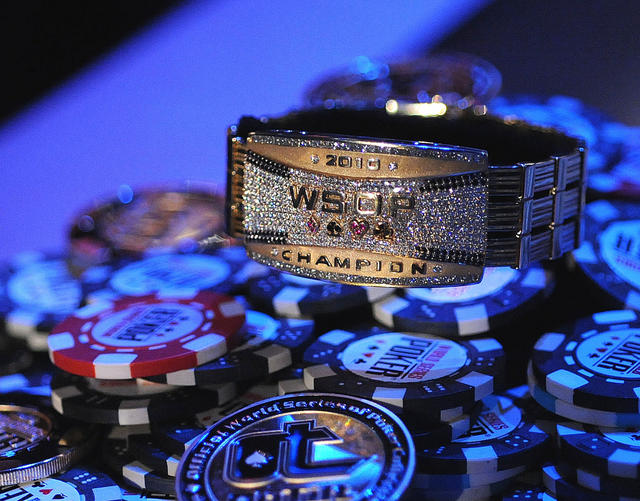
2010 WSOP bracelet designed by Soffa

In 2010, Soffa was selected as the official jewelry designer for the World Series of Poker (WSOP).

Working with the tournament's organizers, he designed and manufactured the championship bracelets awarded during the 2010 tournament series, including the Main Event championship bracelet won by Jonathan Duhamel, and special designs for the $50,000 Poker Players Championship and Ladies Championship.

The bracelets incorporated 14-karat gold, diamonds, rubies, and playing-card motifs. The Main Event bracelet featured approximately 550 individually set diamonds, totaling nearly four carats.

Soffa's designs introduced individually personalized championship bracelets, with winners' names and tournament details engraved on each piece. The bracelets were accompanied by custom presentation cases and certificates of authenticity.

The commission received coverage from publications including PokerNews and the Las Vegas Sun.

His association with the WSOP also included a collection of poker-inspired watches and jewelry featuring original designs such as Suicide King, Ace of Pain, and Joker.

=== Sturgis Motorcycle Rally and commemorative designs ===
In 2015, Soffa developed an officially licensed watch and jewelry collection commemorating the 75th anniversary of the Sturgis Motorcycle Rally in South Dakota.

The collection incorporated anniversary insignia, custom artwork, and design elements associated with the rally's history and American motorcycle culture.

In 2018, he designed personalized rectangular watches for inductees into the Sturgis Motorcycle Museum & Hall of Fame.

His involvement with motorcycle-related design has continued through limited-edition watches, jewelry collections, and private commissions associated with the annual Sturgis Rally.

=== Collaboration with Scott Jacobs ===
Soffa has collaborated with American artist Scott Jacobs, whose paintings frequently depict motorcycles, automobiles, and subjects associated with American popular culture.

Their first collaborative watch, Art and Sole, was introduced in April 2016 and incorporated imagery from Jacobs's original painting into a collectible timepiece.

In 2018, the collaboration expanded with For Your Eyes Only, a women's watch featuring Jacobs's artwork.

The partnership continued with the development of Drive Time and Honor, two additional watch designs introduced through Jacobs Gallery in July 2025.

These projects combined Jacobs's original artwork with Soffa's watch design and manufacturing experience, translating fine-art compositions into functional timepieces.

=== Shelby American and automotive collaborations ===
In 2022, Soffa was commissioned through Carroll Shelby Licensing to design commemorative watches celebrating the 60th anniversary of Shelby American, the American high-performance automotive company founded by Carroll Shelby.

The collection drew inspiration from the Shelby Cobra and the company's automotive heritage, incorporating design details associated with classic American performance vehicles.

=== Bespoke jewelry and contemporary work ===
In addition to watchmaking, Soffa designs custom jewelry and commemorative pieces for private collectors, corporations, and organizations.

His work includes rings, pendants, bracelets, awards, and individually commissioned jewelry incorporating precious metals, gemstones, dimensional artwork, and personalized design elements.

Through Steve Soffa Enterprises, he continues to develop original watch and jewelry collections, collaborative designs, and bespoke commissions.

His contemporary work includes fine jewelry, limited-edition timepieces, commemorative collections, and personalized pieces designed around the interests and histories of individual collectors.

== Awards ==
- In 2008, winner of JCK (Jeweler's Choice Awards) award for best watch design.
- In 2012, Gold Winner at PPAI National Branding Show for best technical design and complication for "Ace of Pain" timepiece (ART720)
- In 2013, Silver award winner at the PPAI National Branding Show in the category of Best Technical Design for "Twisted Love" ART700.
