= Shirley Impellizzeri =

American clinical psychologist

Shirley Impellizzeri is an American clinical psychologist who has appeared as an expert on numerous television shows, including Sex Rehab with Dr. Drew and Celebrity Rehab with Dr. Drew, Bravo Channel's Workout as Jackie Warner's therapist. and on the second season of VH1's "Hollywood Exes" as a therapist for Jessica Canseco.

== Early life and education ==
Born and raised in Los Angeles, she attended high school in her parents' native Argentina, returning to the United States for university. Impellizzeri earned her PhD in psychology from the University of California Los Angeles. While working on her doctorate, she investigated child abuse cases for the Los Angeles Department of Children and Family Services. Impellizzeri continues to serve as an expert witness in court cases involving child abuse.

== Career ==
She has hosted The Dr. Shirley and Steve Show with communication expert and public relations executive Steve Rohr since August 2012. The psychology talk show airs on the UBN Radio network. A running bit between the hosts is Impellizzeri's infatuation with singer songwriter Barry Manilow. Guests have included: James Van Praagh, Mariette Hartley, Carolyn Hennesy, Howard Fine, Marisa Ramirez, Dr. Stan Tatkin, James Underdown, Chuti Tiu, Oscar Torre, Cheryl Woodcock, Maureen Flannigan, Dr. Lawrence Heller, Dr. Paul Abramson, Dr. Gary Small and Josefina Lopez. The show has covered topics ranging from video gamers to PTSD. On July 16, 2013, The Dr. Shirley and Steve Show marked the tenth anniversary of the Santa Monica Farmer's Market accident, which left ten people dead and injured 63, one of whom was Jenna Edwards who appeared on the show to share her experience.

Impellizzeri has appeared on the cover of Woman's World magazine and is currently the Sex, Love, and Relationship expert for Cosmopolitan Latina magazine, answering questions from readers in her "Let's Talk Sex" column.

Impellizzeri is the author of Why Can't I Change? How to Conquer Your Self-Destructive Patterns (Sunrise River Press, May 2012).

== Personal life ==
Imperllizzeri maintains a private practice in Beverly Hills. She is fluent in Spanish and English.
