= Steve George =

Steve, Steven or Stephen George may refer to:

- Steve George (American football) (born 1951), American football player
- Steve George (keyboardist) (born 1955), keyboardist for pop band Mr. Mister
- Steve George, bassist for Swervedriver
- Steve George, fictional character on Australian soap opera Neighbours
- Stephen George (musician), drummer with Ministry
- Stephen George (politician), Indian politician
- Stephen R. George, Canadian author
- Steven George (born 1982), Australian Paralympic tandem cycling pilot
- Steven M. George, American physicist
