= Steeve =

Steeve is a given name. Notable people with the name include:

- Steeve Beusnard (born 1992), French footballer
- Steeve Barry (born 1991), French Rugby sevens player
- Steeve Briois (born 1972), French politician
- Steeve Curpanen (born 1972), Mauritian footballer
- Steeve-Mike Eboa Ebongue (born 2000), French footballer
- Steeve Elana (born 1980), French-born Martinican footballer
- Steeve Epesse-Titi (born 1979), French footballer
- Steeve Estatof (born 1972), French singer-songwriter
- Steeve Falgayrettes, French Guianan professional football manager
- Steeve Gerard Fankà (born 1988), Cameroonian footballer
- Steeve Guénot (born 1985), French wrestler
- Steeve Gustan (born 1985), Martinican footballer
- Steeve Ho You Fat (born 1988), French basketball player
- Steeve Joseph-Reinette (born 1983), French footballer
- Steeve Lavoie, Canadian politician
- Steeve Nguema Ndong (1971–2009), Gabonese judoka
- Steeve Saint-Duc (born 2000), Haitian footballer
- Steeve Theophile (born 1980), French footballer
- Steeve Yago (born 1992), French-born Burkina Faso footballer

== See also ==
- Steve, given name
