= Steevens =

Steevens is an English surname, and may refer to:

- Charles Steevens (?–1761), British naval officer in the Siege of Pondicherry
- George Steevens (1736–1800), English Shakespearean commentator
- G. W. Steevens (1869–1900), British journalist and writer
- Harry Steevens (born 1945), Dutch cyclist, brother of Henk
- Henk Steevens (1931–2020), Dutch cyclist, brother of Harry
- Grizell Steevens (1653–1746), Irish philanthropist
- Morrie Steevens (born 1940), American baseball pitcher

== See also ==
- Steeven
- Stevens
