= Stevie (given name) =

Stevie is a unisex given name, usually a short form (hypocorism) of Stephen, Steven, Stephanie and other names, and occasionally a nickname. It may refer to:

- Stevie Baggs (born 1981), American former football player, actor, motivational speaker, and author
- Stephanie Stevie Cameron (born 1943), Canadian investigative journalist and writer
- Stevana Stevie Case (born 1976), American game designer and eSports player
- Stephen Stevie Eskinazi (born 1994), South African-born English cricketer
- Stephen Flemmi (born 1934), Italian-American gangster and FBI informant
- Stephen Stevie Jackson (born 1969), Scottish guitarist, singer and songwriter
- Steven Stevie Johnson (born 1986), American football player
- Steven Stevie May (born 1992), Scottish footballer
- Stevie McCrorie (born 1985), Scottish singer-songwriter
- Stephanie Stevie Nicks (born 1948), American singer-songwriter, best known for her work with Fleetwood Mac and solo career
- Stevie Ray (fighter) (born 1990), Scottish mixed martial artist
- Stevie Reeves (born 1967), American professional stock car racing driver and spotter
- Esteban Stevie Rodriguez (born 1994), American footballer
- Stevie Ryan (1984–2017), American YouTube personality, actress and comedian, star of the series Stevie TV
- Stevie Salas (fl. 1985–present), Native American guitarist
- Stevie Scott (born 2000), American football player
- Florence Stevie Smith (1902–1971), English poet and novelist
- Stephanie Stevie Spring (born 1957), British businesswoman and media executive
- Stevie Tu'ikolovatu (born 1991), American football player
- Stevie Vann (fl. 1970s–present), Zambian-born British singer
- Stephen Stevie Ray Vaughan (1954–1990), American guitarist, singer, songwriter and record producer
- Stephen Steve Winwood (born 1948), English rock singer and multi-instrumentalist
- Stevland Stevie Wonder (born 1950), American singer and multi-instrumentalist
- Joseph Stephen Stevie Woods (musician) (1951–2014), American singer
- Stephen Stevie Wright (1947–2015), English-born Australian pop star singer-songwriter
- Stephen Stevie Young (born 1956), Scottish rhythm guitarist and backing vocalist for the hard rock band AC/DC

== See also ==
- Steve
- Robert Baden-Powell, 1st Baron Baden-Powell (1857–1941), British Army officer and founder of The Boy Scouts Association and the Girl Guides, nicknamed "Stephe" (pronounced "Stevie") by his family
