= Steve Barker =

Steve or Steven Barker may refer to:

- Steve Barker (film director), (born 1971), English film director and screenwriter
- Steve Barker (soccer), (born 1967), South African footballer
- Steven Barker, British man charged in the Death of Baby P

== See also ==
- Stephen Barker (disambiguation)
- Steve Baker (disambiguation)
