= Stephen Ryan =

Stephen Ryan may refer to:

- Stephen V. Ryan (1825–1896), Canadian-born American prelate of the Roman Catholic Church
- Stephen Ryan (footballer) (born 1970), Australian rules football player
- Stephen Ryan (sport shooter), sport shooter from the Norfolk Islands
- Stephen Ryan, host of Gardening Australia (2009-2011)

== See also ==
- Steve Ryan (disambiguation)
