= Darling (magazine) =

US magazine

- Editor-in-chief: Sarah Dubbeldam
- Categories: Lifestyle, Beauty, Travel, Self-empowerment, Art
- Frequency: Quarterly
- Founder: Sarah Dubbeldam
- Founded: 2009
- First issue: 2012 fall
- Country: United States
- Based in: Los Angeles, California
- Language: English
- Website: www.darlingmagazine.org

Darling Media is an independent, quarterly women's fashion magazine. Its stated mission is to empower women and has featured notable women such as Meghan, Duchess of Sussex, Lauren Conrad, Jennifer Morrison, Olivia Wilde, Kathy Bates, Kristen Bell, Minka Kelly. The magazine is based in Los Angeles, California, in the United States.

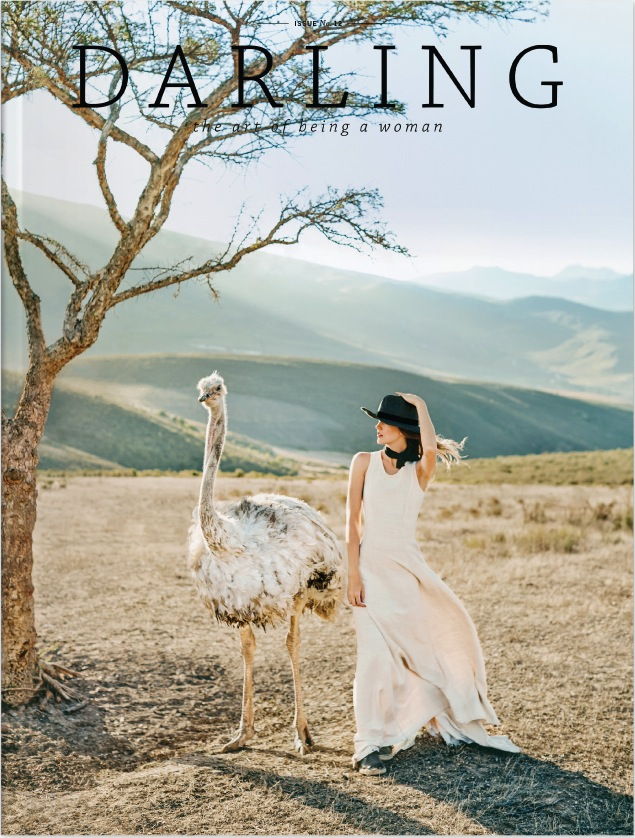
Issue 12 of the magazine.

== The Magazine ==
Sarah Dubbeldam created Darling in 2009 with her husband, Steve Dubbeldam. The magazine began as a blog and produced its first print issue in the fall of 2012. Darling is advertised as embracing women of different ethnicities and body types, and no photographs are retouched. Its articles tend to include topics of self-empowerment, self-improvement, career, relationships, style, travel, recipes, interviews, features, and stories. Within each issue, Darling partitions articles into eight "personas" which are: The Dreamer, The Hostess, The Confident, The Stylist, The Explorer, The Beautician, The Intellectual, and The Achiever.

In addition to its print publication, Darling hosts "Darling Dinner" events that take place around the United States. Each event is themed around a selected topic as the focus of a meal and conversation. Darling also holds "Darling Retreat" events, hosting workshops, meals, and guided conversations for personal growth and entrepreneurship. In 2013, they launched the #DarlingMovement with hopes of motivating readers after reading Darling issues. In 2017, Darling Media also introduced a new equity crowdfunding portal from Micro Ventures and Indiego.

== Reception ==
Darling received critical praise for its topics regarding female empowerment. The Huffington Post has stated: Darling "encourages a woman to be the best version of herself rather than a cheap one-dimensional imitation of a false reality". Paper & Type Graphic Design Co. called Darling magazine a "publication that roots for womankind, with articles to encourage, to sweeten and cheer, to listen to, and to celebrate women". In July 2016, the publication was featured as a "small business success" on Morning Express with Robin Meade.

=== Philanthropy ===
Darling donates a portion of its proceeds from the sale of its magazine to support the fight against sex trafficking in the Dominican Republic.
