= Jireh Industries =

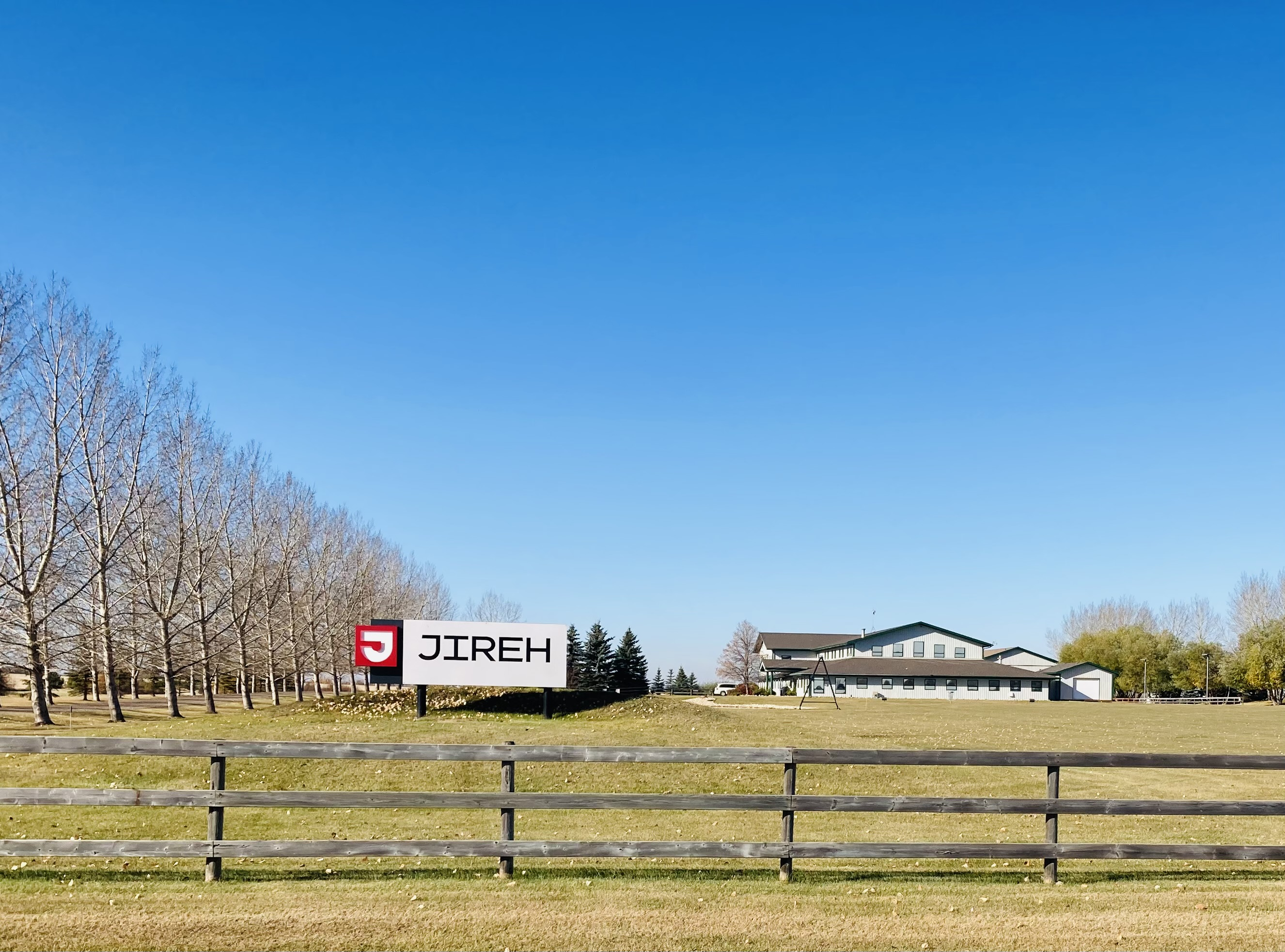
- Jireh Industries headquarters in Ardrossan
- Interactive map of the Jireh Industries area

General information
- Location: 53158 Range Rd 224, Ardrossan, AB T8E 2K4
- Coordinates: 53°34′2.6″N 113°11′55.9″W
- Opened: 1982

Website
- https://www.jireh.com/

Jireh Industries is an electronic control module manufacturer which primarily manufacturers robotic corrosion scanners and welding scanners for use in the petroleum industry. The company's headquarters are in Ardrossan, Alberta, with additional offices in Houston and Rotterdam.

== Background ==
Jireh Industries was founded in the early 1980s. (Note: Jireh Industries first appeared in the City of Edmonton Yellow Pages in 1982. In 1988, the Edmonton Journal described Jireh Industries as a "five year old company.") In 1987, the company built a food processing machine that created potatoes of a uniform size and shape; this was achieved by making an artificial potato skin out of bran and starch in a metal mold and subsequently pumping a mashed potato solution therein. Following the creation of this machine, the Edmonton Journal stated that the company had "built a reputation as machine shop innovators."

In February 1991, Jireh Industries presented to the Alberta Premier's Council of Science and Technology. This presentation took place under the Honourable Don Getty's premiership of Alberta. The University of Alberta's publication Folio listed Arthur Dubbeldam as "President" of Jireh Industries. Dubbeldam had previously been educated at the University of Alberta in Edmonton, obtaining his degree in Mechanical Engineering in 1977.

In 2002, when reporting on the industrial growth of Strathcona County, Alberta, the National Post reported that "Jireh Industries... does aerospace quality machining and makes robots that inspect on-surface and underwater pipelines for cracks and corrosion."

== See also ==
- Corrosion mapping by ultrasonics
- Electronic control unit
- Jehovah-jireh
