= Stephen Walsh =

Steve, Stephen or Steven Walsh may refer to:

- Steve Walsh (American football) (born 1966), former quarterback in the National Football League
- Steve Walsh (DJ) (1959–1988), British disc jockey
- Steve Walsh (footballer) (born 1964), former professional footballer
- Steve Walsh (musician) (born 1951), of the 1970s progressive rock band Kansas
- Steve Walsh (rugby league) (born 1958), Australian rugby league player for South Sydney
- Steve Walsh (rugby union) (born 1972), New Zealand referee affiliated to the Australian Rugby Union
- Steven Walsh (born 1973), American politician
- Stephen Walsh (athlete) (born 1960), retired male long jumper from New Zealand
- Stephen Walsh, CSC (educator) (1941-2011), 20th president of St. Edward's University
- Stephen Walsh (hurler) (born 1985), Irish hurler
- Stephen Walsh (money manager) (born 1944), American money manager
- Stephen Walsh (politician) (1859–1929), British miner, trade unionist and Labour Party politician
- Stephen Walsh (writer) (born 1942), English writer and scholar
- Stephen Walsh (footballer) (born 1990), Irish footballer
- Steve Walsh (scout), English football scout
