= Steve Dubbeldam =

Canadian-American entrepreneur

- Born: Edmonton, Canada
- Citizenship: Canadian; American
- Occupation: Entrepreneur
- Spouse: Sarah Dubbeldam
- Family: Arthur Dubbeldam

Steve Dubbeldam is a Canadian-American entrepreneur, adventurer, and fashion designer.

== History ==
Steve Dubbeldam co-founded the denim company Iron Army in 2004. In 2008, Dubbeldam co-founded City of Others denim company. In 2012, Dubbeldam co-founded Darling magazine.

== Wilderness Collective ==
In 2011, Dubbeldam founded Wilderness Collective, a Los Angeles-based adventure company. In 2015, Charles Fleming of the LA Times wrote that "founder Steve Dubbeldam aims to get guys out of their comfort zone so they can experience something epic."
