= Steve Rohr =

American academic

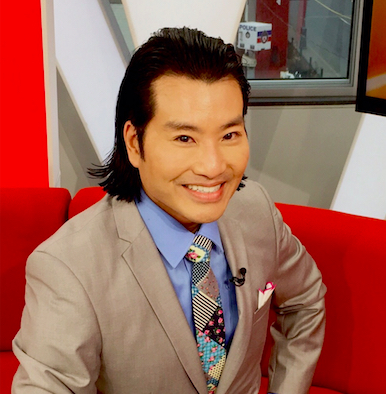
Steve Rohr on the set of the Canadian national entertainment news show ETALK (Toronto, April 11, 2016)

Steve Rohr is an American communication expert, educator, public relations executive, and author. He appears frequently in both American and Canadian media as a public speaking, body language, and nonverbal Communication expert.

He has taught Communication and Public Relations at several colleges and universities including California State University, Long Beach, Loyola Marymount University, MiraCosta College, and Saddleback College among others.

Rohr is the show publicist for the Academy Awards telecast. Along with Dr. Shirley Impellizzeri, he is the co-author of Scared Speechless: 9 Ways to Overcome Your Fears and Captivate Your Audience, published in March 2016. Additionally, he is a regular contributor to Backstage magazine, an entertainment-industry brand aimed at people working in film and the performing arts, with a special focus on casting, job opportunities, and career advice.
