= Steve Brantley Spence =

- Born: August 18, 1989 (age 36); Norfolk, Virginia
- Occupations: Securities advisor, football coach (former)
- Known for: Brandished loaded firearms at Smith High School in Greensboro, North Carolina. Convicted of interstate domestic violence and use of a firearm to commit a federal crime of violence.

Steve Brantley Spence (born August 18, 1989) is a convicted felon and former college football linebacker from East Carolina University. On December 3, 2018, Spence was taken into custody while brandishing two handguns on the grounds of Ben L. Smith High School in Greensboro, North Carolina. Earlier that morning, Spence had strangled a romantic partner in Virginia Beach, Virginia, who survived, and stolen her SUV. He drove this vehicle to the high school, where he planned to murder another former partner. Arresting officers recovered a document which detailed plans to kill individuals across at least four states. On December 8, 2020, Spence was convicted on federal charges of interstate domestic violence and use by brandishing of a firearm to commit the same. He was sentenced to a total of 114 months (9 years and 6 months) in the Federal Bureau of Prisons.

== Biography ==
=== Early life ===
Spence grew up in Norfolk, Virginia, where he attended Ruffner Middle School and Maury High School and played varsity football all four years, earning all-district honors as a junior and senior. He was recruited by East Carolina, Delaware, and James Madison, and became interested in playing for ECU after attending football camps there.

=== College ===
Spence was enrolled in East Carolina University (ECU) in Greenville, North Carolina, from 2007 to 2010, where he graduated with degrees in business management and marketing. He signed for ECU in February 2007, and was redshirted that year.

=== Careers ===
After obtaining his degrees from ECU, Spence attended grad school at Ball State University in Muncie, Indiana where he used his last year of eligibility and played football. He worked in Muncie, Indiana and Fort Worth, Texas, before returning to Virginia in February 2013. In 2012, he sat and passed the Series 6 and 63 securities licensure exams from the Financial Industry Regulatory Authority. He was arrested on January 11, 2014, on felony unlawful possession of firearm charges in Philadelphia by Officer Robert Bonino of the Philadelphia Police Department. According to FINRA filings, Spence admitted to the substance of the allegations, which arose from a 9mm handgun found in his car after a traffic collision; the charges were dismissed in June 2016 following the completion of a diversion program and payment of fees. Those filings also show that he was terminated from employment at the end of August 2016 at MML Investors Services "in connection with sales practice of traditional life insurance products," in the words of the firm.

Spence subsequently worked as an assistant football coach for Norfolk County Schools, coaching varsity football teams at Maury, Norview, and Oscar Smith High Schools in Hampton Roads; he also served as a substitute teacher for the system.

== Rampage ==
=== Planning ===
According to an arrest warrant filed in Guilford County, Spence allegedly handwrote a one-page plan of action, including at least six planned murders across three states. The document included time to rest and calculated travel times.

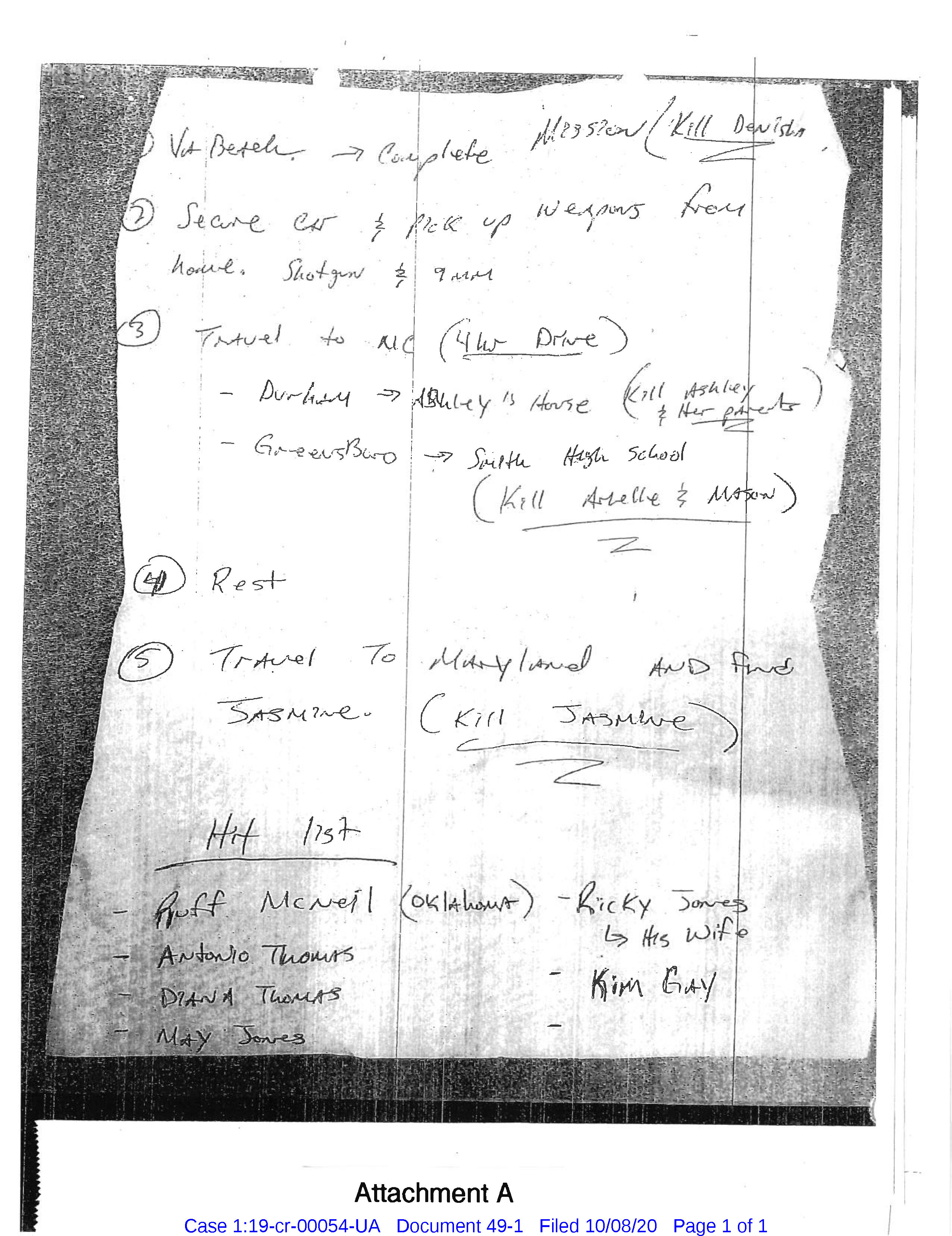
"Hit list" allegedly written by Smith, filed as Factual Basis for Guilty Plea in United States v. Spence.

=== Virginia ===
Police in the city of Virginia Beach, Virginia, allege that Spence was responsible for "brutally beating his current girlfriend," and stealing her automobile on the morning of Monday, December 3, 2018, near the 4700 block of Alicia Drive. Spence was nowhere to be found when officers responded. At the time that he was arrested in North Carolina, he was wanted by the Virginia Beach Police Department for several charges regarding the morning's incident, including grand larceny (regarding an iPhone X), grand larceny of a motor vehicle (a Mercedes-Benz ML350 SUV), strangling another causing wound or injury, and assault on a family member.

=== North Carolina ===
==== Attempted shooting at Smith High School ====
At 12:40 PM on December 3, 2018, Patrick Jordan, a behavior intervention specialist employed at Ben L. Smith High School, a public high school in southern Greensboro, North Carolina, observed a suspicious man moving towards the cafeteria, where students were eating lunch. Noting that the man was not a badged visitor (as is required for all visitors) or a staff member, Jordan followed the man into the B building and into its cafeteria, calling out to him. After Jordan "sped up my steps and increased the volume of my voice," the man brandished a handgun while widely grinning.

Jordan recalls the man threatening to "let off", which he interpreted as an intention to indiscriminately fire into the occupied cafeteria. The man ordered Jordan to radio the two persons listed on the planning document to report to the cafeteria. Knowing that the individuals were not assigned radios, Jordan complied. Hearing Jordan's voice on the radio, Assistant Principal Lashonti Hines arrived at the cafeteria to determine what he needed. Hines walked between Jordan and the armed man, who had moved into the hallway; the man drew his handgun and yelled "Get back!" according to Hines.

Hines immediately ran into the courtyard and radioed for a lockdown while Jordan evacuated students from the cafeteria into a classroom, which could be locked; Hines credits the successful evacuation to students reading her and Jordan's body language, she claims that "they saw my face, they saw my movement and they could tell something was serious . . . when we made that call our kids were moving." After the cafeteria was evacuated, Hines reports that the man was walking about the courtyard between the school's buildings.

Officer D.K. Evans, an eight-year veteran officer at the Greensboro Police Department, had been serving as the school resource officer for Smith High School for the past few months. According to court testimony from a Greensboro Police Detective, Evans heard the call for lockdown over the radio and responded in less than a minute. Evans called for backup units and raced to the courtyard. Evans unholstered his weapon and chased the man, who was attempting to escape with two handguns drawn, toward the school property line near Vanstory Street, where he was met by responding patrol units and arrested following the deployment of a taser; no shots were fired at any time by any person during the entire incident. Greensboro Police Chief Wayne Scott identified the man as Spence in a televised speech, and reported that Spence had a loaded 9mm and .45 ACP handgun drawn, one in each hand, with several boxes of bullets in his backpack.

==== Criminal proceedings ====
Subsequent to Spence's arrest, Greensboro Police units searching the area recovered the ML350 SUV from Virginia at 3717 W Gate City Boulevard, the location of a nearby shopping mall, according to an incident report. A long gun and more ammunition was found inside the vehicle. Spence was arraigned in Guilford County District Court on charges of attempted first degree murder (two counts), going armed to the terror of the people, possession of a firearm on educational property, resisting or obstructing a law enforcement officer, possessing or receiving a stolen motor vehicle, and second-degree trespass. If convicted, he faces a maximum sentence of life without the possibility of parole, according to the judge. A total secured bond of $5.5 million was set and a mental health evaluation was ordered after Spence claimed that, "Jeremiah is screaming in my head," during the hearing.

On February 26, 2019, the United States Attorney for the Middle District of North Carolina announced a grand jury indictment against Spence for interstate transportation of a stolen motor vehicle; interstate travel to commit domestic violence; and use, by brandishing, of a firearm to facilitate the same, the latter of which carries a mandatory minimum sentence of seven years and a statutory maximum sentence of life imprisonment without parole. The United States also sought to seize by criminal forfeiture all firearms used in the incident. On January 31, 2020, a superseding indictment was filed in the case, adding an additional charge of violation of the federal carjacking statute, 18 U.S.C. 2119. On December 8, 2020, Spence pleaded guilty to interstate domestic violence and use of firearm to commit the same, in exchange for the dismissal of the carjacking and transportation of stolen vehicle counts. The court adjudged him guilty of these two counts and set sentencing for March 2021.

=== Further plans ===
The planning document included in Spence's warrant included a plan to murder one person in Durham along with their family, to rest, and then to proceed to Maryland and kill at least one other person; the bottom of that scan document is largely unreadable. However, the bottom of the copy filed in court lists six more people to be killed as a "Hit list".
