= Steven Gray (professor) =

American environmental social scientist

Steven Gray is an American environmental social scientist, environmental psychologist, and professor. He is known for creating the software platform Mental Modeler and for advancing the use of Fuzzy Cognitive Mapping for sustainability, knowledge integration, and applied decision-making.

== Early life and education ==
Gray earned a B.A. in Anthropology from the University of Texas at Austin, and a Ph.D. in Ecology and Evolution from Rutgers University.

== Academic career ==
Gray is a Professor in the Department of Community Sustainability at Michigan State University. His research examines the knowledge integration and how biological, economic, and cognitive diversity impact social-ecological dynamics, resilience, and adaptive capacity. He has been a principal investigator on interdisciplinary projects funded by the National Science Foundation (NSF), the National Oceanic and Atmospheric Administration (NOAA), the United States Department of Agriculture (USDA), and the Defense Advanced Research Projects Agency (DARPA).

Gray's work integrates participatory modeling, visual systems thinking, computational social science, and environmental governance. He is the developer of Mental Modeler, a tool that enables stakeholders, along with traditional scientific experts, to visually model systems, run intervention scenarios, and understand trade-offs, which has been applied in multiple domains.

== Mental Modeler and Fuzzy Cognitive Mapping ==
Mental Modeler significantly expanded the accessibility and applicability of Fuzzy Cognitive Mapping in scientific research. The software has been widely adopted in environmental planning and systems modeling.

== Urban Knowledge Syndrome ==
Gray, along with Payam Aminpour, Steven Scyphers, and Jennifer Helgeson, coined the term "Urban Knowledge Syndrome" in a 2022 paper published in Urban Sustainability. The concept refers to the personal, social, cultural, and experiential biases that arise when urban-centric experiences influence how individuals understand their external environment. These dynamics influence environmental policy, planning, and decision outcomes that may otherwise marginalize local, Indigenous, or rural knowledge in the process. The syndrome highlights the risks of knowledge homogenization and calls for more inclusive approaches to sustainability decision-making.

== Selected publications ==
- Gray, S., A. Chan, D. Clark, and R.C. Jordan. (2012) Modeling the integration of stakeholder knowledge in social-ecological system decision-making: Benefits and limitations to knowledge diversity. Ecological Modeling 229, 88-96.
- Gray, S. S. Gray, L. Cox, and S. Henly-Shepard. (2013) Mental modeler: A fuzzy-logic cognitive mapping modeling tool for adaptive environmental management. Proceedings of the 46th International Conference on Complex Systems. 963-973
- Aminpor, P., S. Gray, A. Jetter, J. Introne, and R. Arlinghaus. (2020) The wisdom of stakeholder crowds in complex social-ecological systems. Nature Sustainability. 3(13), 191-199.
- Aminpour, P. S. Gray, M. Beck, K. Furman, I. Tsakiri, R. Gittman, J. Grabowski, J. Helgeson, L. Josephs, M. Ruth, and S. Scyphers. (2022) Urbanized knowledge syndrome: Lower knowledge diversity and systems thinking in urban coastal residents. Urban Sustainability. 2 (1), 1-10.
