= Stephen Walsh (educator) =

American Catholic brother and academic

Brother Stephen Walsh C.S.C.

20th President of St. Edward's University
- In office 1972–1984
- Preceded by: Edgar Roy
- Succeeded by: Patricia Hayes

Personal details
- Born: February 27, 1941 Long Beach, California, U.S.
- Died: January 10, 2011 (aged 69) Austin, Texas, U.S.
- Resting place: Assumption Cemetery; Austin, Texas, U.S.
- Education: St. Edward's University (BA); Our Lady of the Lake University (MEd); University of Texas at Austin (PhD)

Academic work
- Institutions: Holy Cross of San Antonio (teacher, c. 1963); St. Edward's University (various positions, 1966–84; 2002-11); Notre Dame High School (principal, 1986–91); Mount St. Mary's College (dir. of enrollment planning, c. 1992); Holy Cross School (headmaster, 1993–2002)

Stephen Walsh, C.S.C. (February 27, 1941 – January 10, 2011), was an American Catholic brother and academic who served as president of St. Edward's University in Austin, Texas from 1972 to 1984, and as first executive director of the university's Holy Cross Institute from 2005 to 2011. He spent nearly half a century working in a variety of teaching, administrative, and advisory positions at Catholic schools across the US.

== Early life ==
Stephen Vincent Walsh was born February 27, 1941, in Long Beach, California. He attended St. Anthony High School, where he was educated by brothers of the Congregation of Holy Cross. He received his high school diploma in spring of 1958. He decided to join the Holy Cross brothers himself, moving to Rolling Prairie, Indiana and entering the novitiate there in August of the same year. He then enrolled at St. Edward's University, where he was valedictorian of his graduating class. He earned a BA in history in 1962. That August, Walsh returned to California to make his perpetual vows at St. Francis de Sales Church in Sherman Oaks.

== Career ==
=== Early career ===
Walsh briefly taught at Holy Cross High School in San Antonio, Texas before beginning his graduate studies. He earned his MEd at Our Lady of the Lake University in 1964 and his PhD at the University of Texas in 1967. In 1966, while still pursuing his doctorate, Walsh returned to his undergraduate alma mater to join the faculty.

=== St. Edward's University ===
Walsh arrived during a transitional period in the history of St. Edward's. The university, which had been a men's college since it was founded, was in the first stage of an incremental process of gender integration. At the same time, St. Edward's High School was mid-dissolution, closing for good in 1967. Walsh began as an assistant professor of education, then advanced through several administrative ranks before he was made academic dean of the university in 1970, the same year it became fully coeducational.

In 1972, Walsh was appointed president of St. Edward's University, following the resignation of the institution's first lay president, Edgar L. Roy Jr. As of 2026, Walsh remains the only SEU almnus to serve as university president. During his term, he helped establish the university's College Assistance Migrant Program (CAMP), one of the first such initiatives at an American institution of higher education. He was instrumental in establishing New College, a specialized undergraduate program for nontraditional students. He also developed much of the university's core curriculum, as well as freshman studies and capstone programs. By the end of his administration in 1984, he had tied for the distinction of longest-serving president in the history of the university. He was succeeded by Patricia Hayes, who beat this tenure record and was the first woman to hold the office.

=== Later career ===
After he left the president's office, Walsh moved to Rome and lived with a community of Holy Cross brothers there for a year. He then returned to the United States and continued working in academic administration. Highlights of this period include terms as principal of Notre Dame High School in Sherman Oaks (1986–1991), director of enrollment planning at Mount St. Mary's College in Los Angeles (1992), and headmaster of Holy Cross School in New Orleans (1993–2002).

Walsh returned to Austin in 2002, where he would reside for the rest of his life. He took on a new role as assistant provincial of the South-West Province of the Congregation of Holy Cross and serving on the staff of the Holy Cross vocational discernment program at St. Edward's (a community known as Moreau House). In 2005, the university established the Holy Cross Institute, dedicated to fostering unity and cooperation between Holy Cross schools, and appointed Walsh the organization's first executive director. He served in this position until 2011.

== Death ==
Stephen Walsh died in Austin on the night of January 10, 2011, following a stroke. His funeral mass was held at St. Ignatius Martyr Catholic Church, a parish administered by clergy of his order. He was buried in the brothers section of the historic Assumption Cemetery near the campus of St. Edward's University.
