= Steve Owens =

Steve or Stephen Owens may refer to:

== Politics ==
- Steve Owens (Canadian politician) (1956–2016), member of the Legislative Assembly of Ontario
- Steve Owens (Arizona politician) (born 1955), former congressional candidate and chair of the Arizona Democratic Party, current chair of the U.S. Chemical Safety and Hazard Investigation Board
- Steve Owens (Missouri) (born 1956), interim president of the University of Missouri system
- Stephen Owens (Kansas politician), member of the Kansas House of Representatives
- Steven Owens, member of the Massachusetts House of Representatives

== Others ==
- Steve Owens (American football) (born 1947), 1969 Heisman Trophy winner
- Steve Owens (baseball) (born 1965), American college baseball coach
- Stephen T. Owens (born 1948), American lawyer

== See also ==
- Steve Owen (disambiguation)
