= Steve Cox =

Steve Cox may refer to:

- Steve Cox (artist) (born 1958)
- Steve Cox (American football) (born 1958)
- Steve Cox (baseball) (born 1974)
- Steve Cox (wrestler) (born 1959)
- Steve Cox, a former member of Dazz Band

== See also ==
- Stephen Cox (disambiguation)
- Cox (surname)
