= Steve Gottlieb =

Steve Gottlieb is the name of:

- Steve Gottlieb (amateur astronomer) (born 1949)
- Steve Gottlieb (music executive) (born 1957)
