= Steve Sawyer =

Steve Sawyer may refer to:

- Stephen S. Sawyer (born 1952), American commercial illustrator
- Steven Burton Sawyer (born 1960), American information science professor
- Steve Sawyer (environmentalist) (1956–2019), American environmentalist and activist
