= Steve Ryan =

Steve or Steven Ryan may refer to:

== Sportsmen ==
- Steve Ryan (soccer) (born 1956), American soccer player
- Steve Ryan (American football), American football coach in the United States
- Steve Ryan, curler in the 2014 Newfoundland and Labrador Tankard

== Others ==
- Steve Ryan (actor, born 1947) (1947–2007), American actor
- Steve Ryan (actor, born 1980) (born 1980), American actor
- Steve Ryan (author) (born 1949), American author
- Steve Ryan, candidate in the 1985 Ontario general election

== See also ==
- Stephen Ryan (disambiguation)
