= Scott Jacobs =

American painter/actor

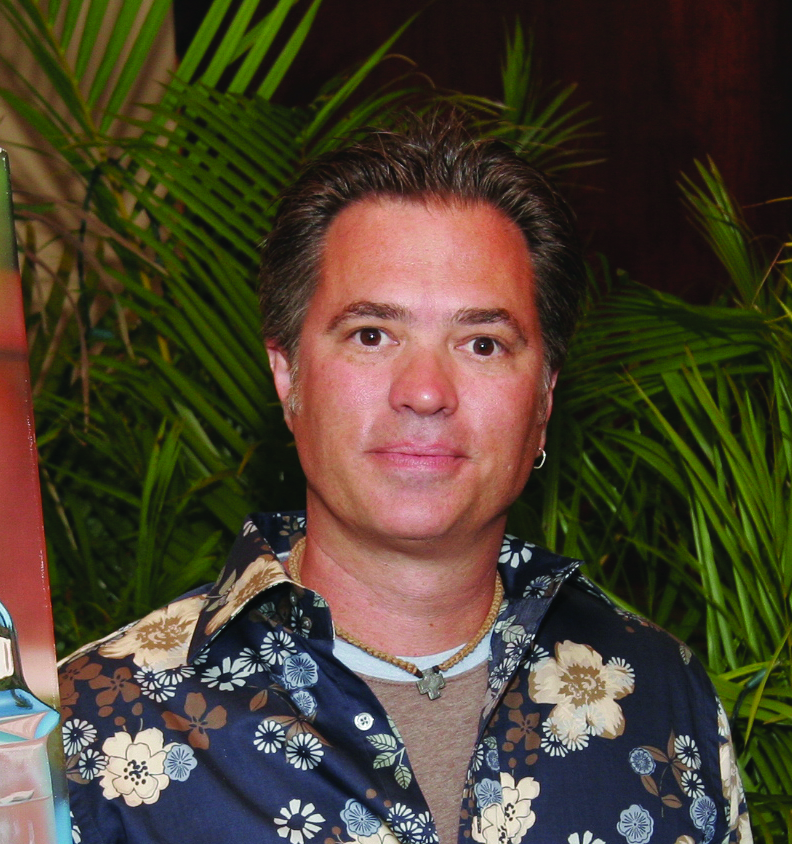
Scott Jacobs

Scott Jacobs is an American artist whose works were included in permanent collections at Petersen Automotive Museum. His works have been licensed by Chevrolet, Mattel, Ford, Marilyn Monroe Estates, and Elvis Presley Enterprises.

== Biography ==
Jacobs was born in Cranford, New Jersey, and grew up in nearby Westfield. He graduated from Westfield High School in 1976, where he drew illustrations for the school’s newspaper. Jacobs worked for an art gallery as a teen and then went on to sell art out of his van. At 19, he purchased an art gallery at below market value and was an art dealer for 25 years.

In 1989, his wife, Sharon, gave him an easel, canvases and paints as a Christmas gift. Jacobs began painting and displaying his work in his own galleries under the assumed name Escotete.

In 1993, a short time after painting two pieces ,"Fat Boy” and “Live to Ride", which featured Harley-Davidson motorcycles. Jacobs' work was seen by the motorcycle manufacturer. Harley-Davidson signed Jacobs in 1993 as its first officially licensed artist in its fine art program, a position he continues to hold.

His works have also been licensed by Chevrolet, Ford, Mattel, Marilyn Monroe Estates, and Elvis Presley Enterprises and others. His work has appeared on Franklin Mint Collector Plates, apparel and other home décor items. Jacobs has drawn the cover art for the official magazine of the Sturgis Motorcycle Rally on fourteen occasions through 2008. His works have been published annually as the cover art on the rally's official magazine through the 2020 edition.

== Museum exhibits and collections ==
Jacobs’ work is included in the permanent collections at the Petersen Automotive Museum in Beverly Hills, California, the Cobb-Murrieta Museum in Marietta, Ga., and the Milwaukee Museum.

Museum exhibits include “Speed Demons, Race Inspired Motorcycle Art at the Journey Museum” in Rapid City, S.D., Aug. 2005, and “Wind Blown: American Motorcycle Fine Art” at the Marietta/Cobb Museum in Marietta. Ga., May–August 2005.

== Personal life ==
In 2012, Jacobs and his younger daughter Alexa were featured on ABC’s reality show Secret Millionaire, where wealthy participants live undercover for a week in poverty and give to local nonprofit organizations. Jacobs gave more than $150,000 in donations to three groups: International Youth Organization, GI Go Fund and Glass Roots.

In 2016, Jacobs suffered a serious injury after crashing during the Motorcycle Cannonball. Due to gravel on the road, Jacobs crashed his 1915 Harley-Davidson. His injuries resulted in broken bones, a bicep tear, and a shoulder replacement. It took seven months of recovery before Jacobs could return to his painting. He completed a second surgery in December 2020 to improve on his previous surgery.

== Books ==
Jacobs has published two books The Motorcycle Art of Scott Jacobs (2001), and The Complete Work of Scott Jacobs (2009).
