= Steve Forrest =

Steve Forrest may refer to:

- Steve Forrest (actor) (1925–2013), American film and television actor born William Forrest Andrews
- Steve Forrest (musician) (born 1986), American musician with the band Placebo
- Steven Forrest (astrologer) (born 1949), American astrologer, author and lecturer
