= Corrosion mapping by ultrasonics =

Corrosion mapping by ultrasonics is a nonintrusive (noninvasive) technique which maps material thickness using ultrasonic techniques.

Variations in material thickness due to corrosion can be identified and graphically portrayed as an image. The technique is widely used in the oil and gas industries for the in-service detection and characterization of corrosion in pipes and vessels. The data is stored on a computer and may be color coded to show differences in thickness readings.

Corrosion may be mapped using Zero degree ultrasonic probes, an Eddy current array and/or Time of flight detection methods. The book Nondestructive Examination of Underwater Welded Structures by Victor S. Davey describes a "fully automated dual axis robotic scanner used for corrosion mapping normally using a single zero degree compression probe scanned in a raster pattern over the area of interest." He also goes on to explain that "typically a 4 mm by 4 mm raster" is used.
