= Steven Gray (American journalist) =

American writer, editor, and producer

Steven Gray is an American writer, editor, and producer.

For more than a decade Gray worked as a reporter for TIME magazine, The Wall Street Journal, and The Washington Post. In 2009, he opened Time Inc.’s Detroit office as bureau chief, developing content for TIME, Fortune and People magazines. Between 2010 and 2012 he was TIME's Washington correspondent covering the intersection of politics, policy and business. His coverage has included Barack Obama, the Great Recession, poverty, education, criminal justice reform, the global food industry, corporate governance, BP's response to the Deepwater Horizon oil spill, Aretha Franklin, Michael Jackson, the same-sex marriage debate, Hurricane Katrina, and the September 11, 2001, terrorist attacks.

Gray was born in New Orleans and received a B.A. degree in journalism from Howard University, where he was editor-in-chief of the student newspaper, The Hilltop. He studied international relations at the University of Kent's Brussels School of International Studies. In 2012 and 2013, he taught journalism at Howard University and George Washington University. He has been a Poynter Institute ethics fellow, and a fellow at the University of California at Berkeley's Knight Digital Media Center. He has provided analysis on National Public Radio, PBS, CNBC, MSNBC, Fox, and the Canadian Broadcasting Corporation.

He lives in New York.
