= Stephen Barker =

Stephen Barker may refer to:

- Stephen Barker (politician) (1846–1924), English-born Australian politician
- Stephen F. Barker (1927–2019), American philosopher of mathematics
- Stephen Barker, surveyor who built the Stephen Barker House, Methuen, Massachusetts
