= Steve Owen =

Steve or Stephen Owen may refer to:

- Steve Owen (American football) (1898–1964), American football player and longtime coach of the New York Giants
- Steve Owen (racing driver) (born 1974), Australian V8 Supercar racing driver
- Steve Owen (EastEnders), fictional character in EastEnders
- Stephen Owen (sinologist) (1946–2026), American sinologist
- Stephen Owen (politician) (1948–2023), Canadian politician

== See also ==
- Steve Owens (disambiguation)
