= Steve O'Donnell =

Steve O'Donnell (or Stephen, or Steven) may refer to:

- Steve O'Donnell (politician), Democratic nominee for U.S. Representative (PA-18)
- Steve O'Donnell (musician) (died 1997), leader of novelty music ensemble Star Turn on 45 (Pints)
- Steve O'Donnell (NASCAR), president of NASCAR
- Steve O'Donnell (writer) (born 1954), television writer
- Steven O'Donnell (Australian actor) (born 1980), Australian television presenter
- Steven O'Donnell (British actor) (born 1963), British television and film actor
- Stephen O'Donnell (Irish footballer) (born 1986), Irish football player (Falkirk, Shamrock Rovers)
- Stephen O'Donnell (footballer, born 1983), Scottish football player (Clyde, Dundee)
- Stephen O'Donnell (footballer, born 1992), Scottish football player (Partick Thistle, Luton Town, Kilmarnock, Motherwell)
- Steve O'Donnell, software developer and founder of GOAL Systems (see Westi)
- Steve O'Donnell, Australian boxer
