= Stan Tatkin =

Relationships and neuroscience author

Stanley Joseph Tatkin
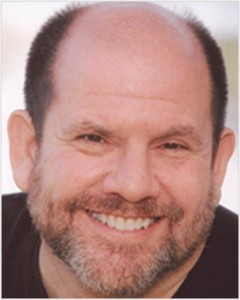
- Born: November 4, 1954 (age 72); Los Angeles, California
- Education: Doctor of Clinical Psychology; Masters of Clinical Psychology; Marriage and Family Therapy
- Alma mater: Antioch University, Los Angeles Ryokan College
- Occupations: Psychogist; Researcher; Author; Public Speaker; Therapist
- Notable work: Wired for Love, We Do
- Spouse: Tracey Boldeman-Tatkin

Stan Tatkin is a clinician, researcher, teacher, and developer of A Psychobiological Approach to Couple Therapy (PACT).

PACT is a polytheoretical, non-linear approach to dyadic systems that integrates developmental neuroscience, arousal regulation, and attachment theory. Psychobiology centers on early attachment and its effect on the developing brain and autonomic nervous system. PACT encourages partners to adopt secure-functioning principles of behavior apart from their actual attachment organization.

Tatkin created the PACT Institute in 2010 with his wife, Tracey Boldemann-Tatkin, PhD, to train mental health professionals to think and work through a psychobiological lens in their clinical practice. Tatkin's work, based on a social-emotional capacity model, focuses on what partners can and cannot do to mitigate threat reactions during stressful interactive sequences. The clinician pays particular attention to each partner's moment-by-moment implicit and explicit behaviors, such as microexpressions, micromovements, and other non-verbal and verbal cues. Sessions are commonly video recorded, and portions may be played back to the couple for feedback and interpretation. Video recorded sessions may also be examined by the clinician for post-inquiry and research by means of digital frame analysis in order to study a couple's behavior more precisely. The goal of the PACT Institute is to help couples and individuals reduce interpersonal stress and threat consequences through secure-functioning principles of fairness, justice, sensitivity, collaboration, and cooperation. Through the PACT Institute, Tatkin has trained thousands of therapists to integrate PACT into clinical practice throughout the U.S., Canada, England, Norway, Turkey, Australia, and Spain. He also co-leads Wired for Love Couple Retreats with his wife, Tracey.

Tatkin's clinical practice is in Calabasas, California. He teaches and supervises family medicine residents at Kaiser Permanente, Woodland Hills, California, and is an associate clinical professor at the UCLA David Geffen School of Medicine, Department of Family Medicine.

Tatkin is known for integrating various theories and models to form the foundation of the comprehensive principles and methodologies he teaches. As a result, the American Association of Marriage and Family Therapists, California, honored Tatkin with the Educator of the Year award 2014.

Tatkin is on the board of directors of Lifespan Learning Institute and serves as a member on the Relationships First Advisory Board, a nonprofit organization founded by Harville Hendrix and Helen LaKelly Hunt.

== Biography ==
Tatkin studied at Antioch University Los Angeles, where he earned his undergraduate and graduate degrees. He received his Psy.D in clinical psychology from Ryokan College in 1994; the college later shut down. Tatkin received his early training in developmental self and object relations (Masterson Institute), Gestalt, psychodrama, and family systems theory. His private practice specialized for some time in treating adolescents and adults with personality disorders. More recently, his interests turned to psycho-neurobiological theories of human relationship and applying principles of early mother-infant attachment to adult romantic relationships.

Tatkin was a primary inpatient group therapist at the John Bradshaw Center, where among other things, he taught mindfulness to patients and staff. He was trained in vipassana meditation by Shinzen Young, PhD, and became an experienced facilitator. He was also trained by David Reynolds, PhD, in two Japanese forms of psychotherapy, Morita and Naikan.

Tatkin was clinical director of Charter Hospital's intensive outpatient drug and alcohol program. Trained in self and object relations for working with personality disorders through the Masterson Institute, he specialized early in his career as a clinician in treating adolescents and adults with personality disorders and drug and alcohol addiction. A former president of the California Association of Marriage and Family Therapists, Ventura County chapter, he is a veteran member of Allan N. Schore’s study group. He also trained in the Adult Attachment Interview by way of Mary Main and Erik Hesse's program through UC Berkeley. He was also trained in Paul Ekman’s Facial Action Coding System by Erika Rosenberg.

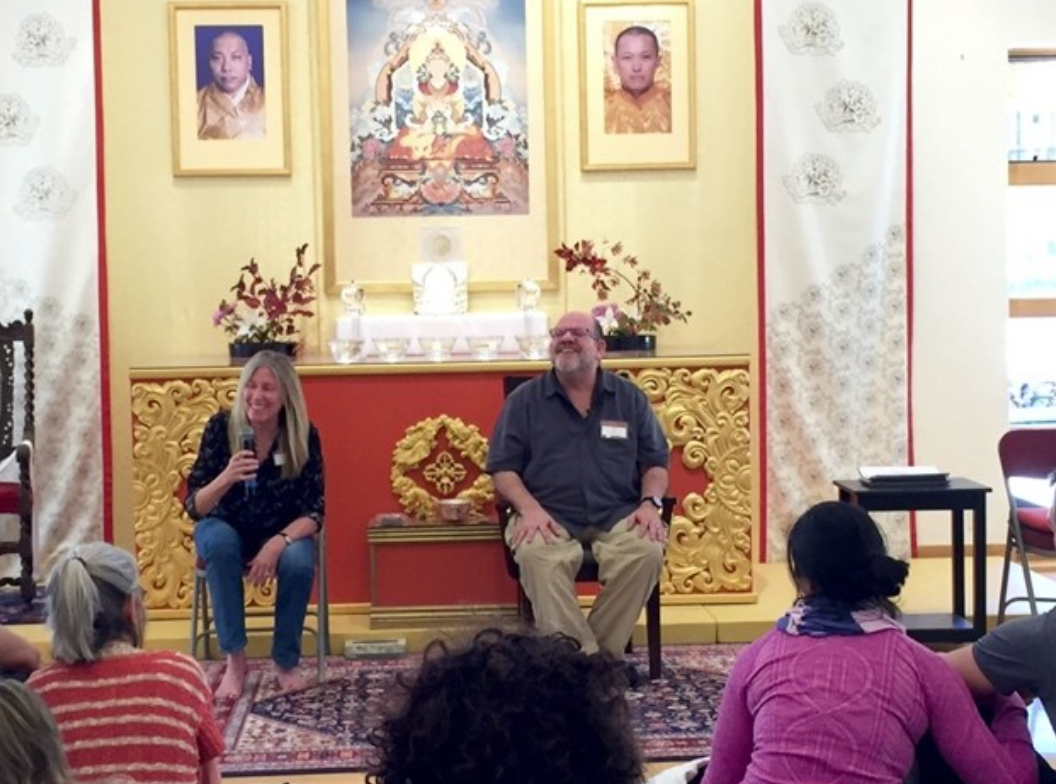
Stan and Tracey leading a Wired for Love Retreat at Shambhala Mountain Center

== A Psychobiological Approach ==
Tatkin developed A Psychobiological Approach to Couple Therapy (PACT).

PACT developed out of research in three areas: neuroscience, attachment theory and biology of human arousal.)

== Publications ==
=== Books, CDs ===
- Hoppe, K., & Tatkin, S. (2021). Baby Bomb: A Relationship Survival Guide for New Parents, Oakland, CA: New Harbinger Publications. ISBN 168403731X.
- Tatkin, S. (2018). We Do: Saying Yes to a Relationship of Depth, True Connection, and Enduring Love. Colorado: Sounds True. ISBN 1622038932.
- Tatkin, S. (2018). The Relationship Rx: Insights and Practices to Overcome Chronic Fighting and Return to Love. [Audio book.] Colorado: Sounds True. ISBN 1683640004.
- Tatkin, S. (2017). How Couples Change: a psychobiological approach to couple therapy (PACT). In M. Solomon & D. J. Siegel (Eds.), How People Change: Relationships and Neuroplasticity in Psychotherapy (pp. 320). New York, New York: W. W. Norton & Company.
- Tatkin, S. (2016). Wired for Dating: How understanding neurobiology and attachment style can help you find your ideal mate. Oakland, California: New Harbinger Publications. ISBN 162625303X.
- Tatkin, S. (2016). Wired for Dating: How understanding neurobiology and attachment style can help you find your ideal mate. (Simplified Characters: N. Chang, Trans.) Jiangxi Education Publishing House Co.
- Tatkin, S. (2012). Your Brain on Love: The neurobiology of healthy relationships. [Audio, 6-CD set] Louisville, CO: Sounds True. ISBN 1604079681.
- Tatkin, S. (2012). Wired for Love: How understanding your partner's brain and attachment style can help you defuse conflicts and build a secure relationship. Oakland, CA: New Harbinger Publications. ISBN 1608820580.
- Tatkin, S. (2012). Wired for Love: How understanding your partner's brain and attachment style can help you defuse conflicts and build a secure relationship. Prague, Czech Republic. Synergie Publishing.
- Tatkin, S. (2012). Wired for Love: How understanding your partner's brain and attachment style can help you defuse conflicts and build a secure relationship. (M. Hidalgo, Trans.). Granada, Spain. Penguin Random House Grupo Editorial, Mexico. ASIN BOIFYKCCS.
- Tatkin, S. (2012). Wired for Love: How understanding your partner's brain and attachment style can help you defuse conflicts and build a secure relationship. Bucharest, Romania. Editura Herald: S.C. V & I Herald Grup. ISBN 9731115420.
- Tatkin, S. (2012). Wired for Love: How understanding your partner's brain and attachment style can help you defuse conflicts and build a secure relationship. Istanbul, Turkey. Okuyan Us Publishing. ISBN 6058031486.
- Tatkin, S. (2012). Wired for Love: How understanding your partner's brain and attachment style can help you defuse conflicts and build a secure relationship. Warsaw, Poland. Institute of Health Psychology, Polish Psych Association. ISBN 8360747792.
- Tatkin, S. (2012). Wired for Love: How understanding your partner's brain and attachment style can help you defuse conflicts and build a secure relationship. (Simplified Characters: N. Chang, Trans.). NanChang City, JiangXi Province, China. Jiangxi Education Publishing House Co.
- Tatkin, S. (2012). Wired for Love: How understanding your partner's brain and attachment style can help you defuse conflicts and build a secure relationship. (Traditional Chinese). Taipei. Acorn Publishing.
- Tatkin, S. (2012). Wired for Love: How understanding your partner's brain and attachment style can help you defuse conflicts and build a secure relationship. Moscow, Russia. Mann, Ivanov, and Ferber.
- Solomon, M., & Tatkin, S. (2010). Love and War in Intimate Relationships: Connection, disconnection, and mutual regulation in couple therapy. New York: Series on Interpersonal Neurobiology, W. W. Norton. ISBN 0393705757.

=== Journals ===
- Tatkin, S. (2011). Ten commandments for relationship essentials. In J. Zeig & T. Kulbatsk (Eds.), For couples: Ten commandments for every aspect of your relationship journey (pp. 29–30). Phoenix, AZ: Milton Erickson Foundation.
- Tatkin, S. (2011). Allergic to hope: Angry resistant attachment and a one-person psychology within a two-person psychological system. Psychotherapy in Australia, 18(1), 66–73.
- Tatkin, S. (2010). Infidelity, Affairs, and Reparation. New Therapist Magazine, 69(September/October), 7.
- Tatkin, S. (2009). A Psychobiological Approach to Couple Therapy: Integrating Attachment and Personality Theory as Interchangeable Structural Components. Psychologist-Psychoanalyst: Division 39 of the American Psychological Association, 29(3), 7–15.
- Tatkin, S. (2009). I Want You In The House, Just Not In My Room... Unless I Ask You: The Plight Of The Avoidantly Attached Partner In Couples Therapy. New Therapist Magazine, 62(July/August), 10–16.
- Tatkin, S. (2009). Addiction To "Alone Time" - - Avoidant Attachment, Narcissism, And A One-Person Psychology Within A Two-Person Psychological System. The Therapist, 57(January–February), 37–45.
