= Stephen R. George =

Scottish-Canadian author

- Born: 1959 (age 66–67); Scotland
- Other names: Jack Ellis, Valerie Stephens
- Occupation: author
- Known for: horror fiction, suspense, dark fantasy

Stephen R. George (born 1959) is a Canadian author of horror fiction, suspense and dark fantasy. He writes under his name and the pseudonyms Jack Ellis and Valerie Stephens.

George has published 14 novels. His novels have been translated into Italian, Polish, Russian, and Norwegian. His short stories have appeared in several publications and anthologies, including Cemetery Dance and the Hot Blood series.

George was born in Scotland in 1959; he lives and works in Canada.

== Novels ==
- Nightlife (1996) by Jack Ellis, (reprinted 2000)
- Seeing Eye (1995) by Jack Ellis, (reprinted 2000)
- Mirror, Mirror (1994) by Valerie Stephens
- Torment (1994)
- Bloody Valentine (1994)
- Deadly Vengeance (1993)
- Nightscape (1992)
- Near Dead (1992)
- The Forgotten (1991)
- Grandma's Little Darling (1990)
- Dark Reunion (1990)
- Dark Miracle (1989)
- Beasts (1989)
- Brain Child (1989)

== See also ==
List of horror fiction authors
