= Steve Garvey (disambiguation) =

Steve Garvey (born 1948) is an American former baseball player.

Steve Garvey may also refer to:

- Steve Garvey (footballer) (born 1973), English former professional footballer
- Steve Garvey (musician) (born 1958), bass guitarist of the punk band Buzzcocks
