= Steve Stone =

Steve Stone is the name of:

- Steve Stone (baseball) (born 1947), American baseball player and broadcaster
- Steve Stone (footballer) (born 1971), former English footballer
- Steve Stone (ice hockey) (born 1952), retired Canadian ice hockey player
- Steve Stone (rugby league) (born 1969), Australian rugby league player
- Steve Stone, with Dream Theater
- Steve Stone, a fictional, recurring character during seasons 1 and 2 of the Manifest (TV series)

== See also ==
- Steven Stone, a character in the Pokémon series
