= Steve Patterson =

Steve Patterson may refer to:

- Steve Patterson (TV and radio host), American TV and radio host
- Steve Patterson (basketball) (1948–2004), American basketball player and coach
- Steve Patterson (sports executive) (born 1958), American sports executive with teams in several different leagues
- Steve Patterson (comedian), Canadian stand-up comedian and humour writer
- Steve Patterson (soccer), American retired soccer player
- Steve Patterson (politician), American politician from Mississippi
- Steve Dylan, Canadian comedian and humour writer, formerly known as Steve Patterson

== See also ==
- Steven Patterson (born 1983), Yorkshire cricketer
- Stephen Patterson (born 1971), Australian rules footballer
- Steve Paterson (born 1958), Scottish footballer and manager
