= Steve Nickles =

American lawyer and professor

Steve Nickles is an American lawyer and known figure in his field, currently the C. C. Hope Chair in Law and Management and previously the Bess and Walter Williams Distinguished Professor of Law, at Wake Forest University. He was also the Roger F. Noreen Chair in Law at University of Minnesota.
