= Steven Kelly (survivalist) =

- Born: 1986, March 27; Liverpool. United Kingdom
- Other name: Survival Ste
- Occupations: Survivalist, outdoor instructor, podcaster, television personality
- Known for: Naked and Afraid
- Title: Founder of South West Survival
- Website: https://www.stevenkelly.uk/

Steven Kelly, is a British Survival instructor, television personality, and soldier. He holds the rank of warrant officer in the British Army's 29 Commando Regiment Royal Artillery. Kelly founded South West Survival, a company offering bushcraft and survival training in Plymouth, England.

== Early life and education ==
Steven Kelly was born on 27 March 1986 in Liverpool, United Kingdom. He was raised in Liverpool and developed an interest in outdoor activities and survival skills during his youth. At age 16, Kelly left formal civilian education to enlist in the British Armed Forces and began military training. Over a 23-year career, his education was primarily provided through the British Army, where he completed training to qualify for the 29 Commando Regiment Royal Artillery. His military training included fieldcraft, navigation, and survival skills in various environments such as Arctic, tropical jungles, deserts, and mountainous regions.

Kelly specializes in survival and bushcraft instruction and has provided fieldcraft training to British military personnel and allied forces. In 2018, he was featured training U.S. Marines in the Scottish Highlands during exercise Joint Warrior, as documented by the U.S. Department of Defense and Marine Corps Public.

== Career ==
After retiring from the military, Kelly moved into civilian outdoor education. He founded South West Survival, a bushcraft and wilderness training company based in Plymouth, Devon. The company offers fieldcraft, navigation, and environmental resilience training to various groups, including corporate clients, school groups, military veterans, and families. Kelly also host the Survival Debrief Podcast, which features interviews with survival experts, adventurers, and media figures discussing their experiences.

Kelly's television career includes appearances on international reality and survival-focused programs. In 2017, he took part in the Insight TV survival series Naked Alone and Racing to Get Home, which involved participants navigating through Deadman's Gorge. In 2024, Kelly appeared in the seventeenth season of the Discovery Channel's reality series Naked and Afraid, completing a 21-day survival challenge with an American partner in the Colombian tropics. He later participated in Naked and Afraid: Apocalypse (2025), where he completed a 35-day challenge in South Africa. In 2026, he was featured on the BBC One program Bear Grylls: Wild Reckoning.

== Writing ==
Kelly is the author of the illustrated children's book Survival Ste & Benj Go on an Adventure: A South West Survival Story, published in 2021, which received a Melanie P. Smith Readers' Choice Award. He has also produced a bushcraft and survival journal under the South West Survival name.

== Romance scam victim ==
Kelly has been reported in the media after his photographs were used without permission in online romance scams. In 2021, tabloid and regional outlets covered incidents in which his images appeared in fake profiles, resulting in threats directed at him from individuals who believed they had been defrauded. In 2025, Kelly appeared on ITV's daytime programmed This Morning. The finance website This is the Money reported that fraudsters had used his images in schemes that collectively defrauded victims of more than £1 million.
