= Stephen Porter =

Stephen Porter may refer to:

- Stephen Porter (director) (1925–2013), American stage and television director, producer, set designer, and writer
- Stephen Porter (professor), professor of oral medicine at the Eastman Dental Institute of University College London
- Stephen G. Porter (1869–1930), Republican member of the U.S. House of Representatives from Pennsylvania
- Steve Porter (singer) (1864–1946), American pioneer recording artist
- Steve Porter (producer) (born c. 1978), American house music DJ and producer
- Steve Porter (wheelchair rugby) (born 1969), Australian Paralympic wheelchair rugby union player
- Steven Porter (Canadian politician) (born 1945), member of the Legislative Assembly of New Brunswick
- Stephen C. Porter (1934–2015), professor of geological sciences and director of the Quaternary Research Center, University of Washington
