= Stephen Kelly (Wicklow Gaelic footballer) =

Irish Gaelic footballer and hurler

Personal information
- Native name: Stiofán Ó Ceallaigh (Irish)
- Born: 20 September 1987 (age 39) Greystones, County Wicklow

Sport
- Sport: Gaelic football
- Position: Full-Back
Club
- Years: Club
- ?-present: Éire Óg
Inter-county
- Years: County
- 2009–present: Wicklow

Stephen Kelly (born 20 September 1987) is an Irish Gaelic footballer and hurler who plays for the Wicklow senior Inter-county team since making his senior debut in 2009.
