= Steeve Epesse-Titi =

French football player (born 1979)

Personal information
- Full name: Steeve Gaston Epesse-Titi
- Date of birth: 5 July 1979 (age 47)
- Place of birth: Bordeaux, France
- Height: 1.80 m (5 ft 11 in)
- Position: Defender

Youth career
- Bordeaux

Senior career*
Years	Team	Apps	(Gls)
1997–2000	Bordeaux	0	(0)
2000–2001	Wolverhampton Wanderers	0	(0)
2001	Exeter City	6	(0)
2002–2005	L'Île-Rousse Monticello	–	(–)
2005–2008	Stade Bordelais	–	(–)
- * Club domestic league appearances and goals

Steeve Gaston Epesse-Titi (born 5 July 1979) is a French former professional footballer who played as a defender. He played in the Football League for Exeter City during the 2000–01 season.

== Club career ==
Epesse-Titi began his career at hometown club Bordeaux, but failed to make a first team appearance for their main team. Instead, he played numerous games for Bordeaux B in the French lower leagues before being released in 2000.

The defender moved to England to sign for First Division club Wolverhampton Wanderers after a successful trial. However, he was never to make a first team appearance for Wolves; instead being an unused substitute three times. After eight months at Molineux, he departed to Third Division Exeter City on a free transfer.

He made his Football League debut on 31 March 2001 when he appeared for Exeter in a 2–0 win against Blackpool. This was the first of six appearances for the Grecians during his short-term contract that expired at the end of the campaign.

After having had unsuccessful trials at Kidderminster and Clyde, he returned to France and played out his career with L'Île-Rousse Monticello and Stade Bordelais before retiring in 2008.
