= Steve Kelley =

Steve or Stephen Kelley may refer to:

- Steve Kelley (politician) (born 1953), Minnesota politician
- Steve Kelley (cartoonist), editorial cartoonist, comic strip creator, comedian, and writer
- Steve Kelley, co-host of Canadian reality TV show Junk Brothers
- Stephen Kelley (make-up artist), American make-up artist

== See also ==
- Steve Kelly (disambiguation)
- Kelley (disambiguation)
