= Steffani =

Steffani is the name of:

== Surname ==
- Agostino Steffani (1654–1728), Italian ecclesiastic, diplomat and composer
- Luigi Steffani (1828–1898), Italian painter

== Given name ==
- Steffani Brass (born 1992), American actress
- Steffani Jemison (born 1981), American artist
- Steffani Otiniano (born 1992), Peruvian footballer

== See also ==
- Stefani (disambiguation)
- Stephani
