= Dreifaltigkeitskirche, Speyer =

Church in Rhineland-Palatinate, Germany

Coordinates: 49°19′4″N 8°26′22″E

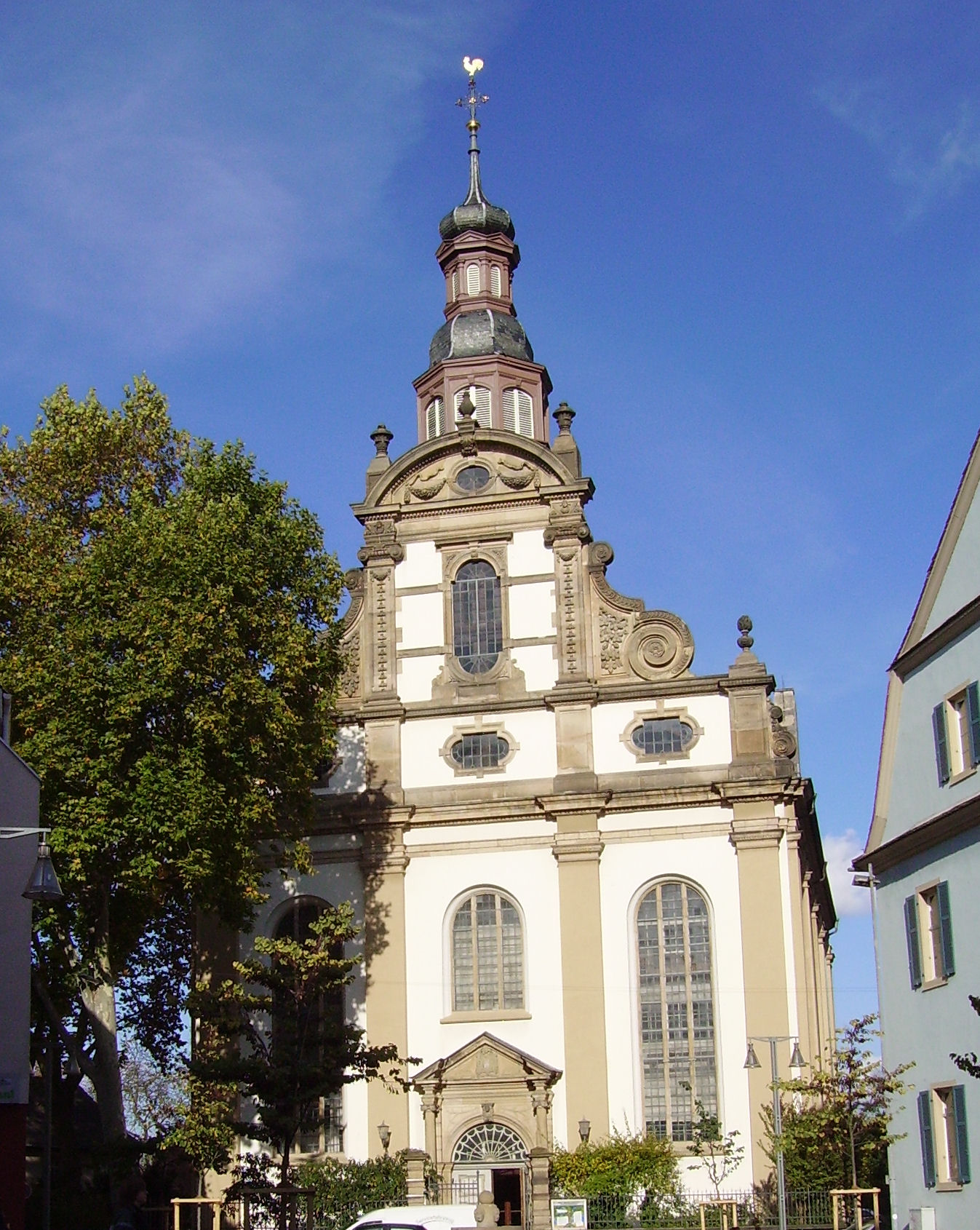
Dreifaltigkeitskirche in Speyer

The Dreifaltigkeitskirche (English: Trinity Church) is a late Baroque, Protestant parish church in Speyer, Rhineland-Palatinate, Germany. Since 1988 it has been a cultural asset worthy of protection within the meaning of Article 1 of the Hague Convention for the Protection of Cultural Property in the Event of Armed Conflict.

== History ==
=== Historical background of the church building and its sister church Heiliggeistkirche ===
In 1689, the town of Speyer was destroyed by order of Louis XIV of France in the Nine Years' War. Since the Reformation, its citizens had been predominantly Lutherans and, to a lesser extent, Reformed Christians. The inhabitants fled via the Rhine, many of them to Frankfurt, as the whole Electoral Palatinate was also destroyed between Speyer and Heidelberg. Only ten years later, in 1698, did some of the inhabitants return.

The small Reformed congregation began the first new church building, the Heiliggeistkirche (Church of the Holy Spirit), in 1700–1702.

In the winter of 1700/01, the Lutheran congregation cleared away the ruins of the 1689 destruction. The foundation work began in April, so that the foundation stone for the Trinity Church was laid on 22 April 1701.

A few days later, the city council laid a second foundation stone, which was accompanied by the Lutheran Church Order of 1700 and the Augsburg Confession of 1530, as well as a pewter tablet stating that "after the barbaric destruction of the city by Gallic hands, this church was built for the glory of God and to adorn the city".

=== Construction Period ===
The foundation of the Trinity Church was laid in 1701 by the master builder Johann Peter Graber. The brickwork was built between 1701 and 1703 by the Italian master bricklayer Paul Bagnato, who in German called himself "Paul Naß". In autumn 1703 the War of the Spanish Succession threatened the city of Speyer. Therefore, it was decided on 17 October 1703 to move the services of the Lutheran congregation from the Gottesackerkirche (cemetery church) in front of the town gates to the still unfinished Dreifaltigkeitskirche within the town walls.

From 1704 the construction of wooden galleries began. However, the construction work inside the church continued until 1717 due to lack of money. The organ was commissioned from the Mainz organ builder Johann Anton Ignaz Will in 1715 and was installed at the beginning of 1717.

On 31 October 1717, the day of the 200th anniversary of the Reformation, the Trinity Church was solemnly inaugurated.

=== French Revolution ===
In 1792 Speyer was conquered by French revolutionary troops. On the second day of Christmas 1793 the last service took place in the Trinity Church. Then the church was plundered, the church vessels had to be delivered, the bells and organ pipes were removed, so that the building finally no longer contained any metal. In the final phase of Napoleonic military campaigns, the church was used as a military hospital for wounded soldiers, and only from 1814 did church services resume.

=== Church union ===
Already in the second half of the 18th century the first rapprochements between Reformed and Lutherans took place. Experiences during the French Revolution reinforced the rapprochement. On 31 October 1817 the Reformed congregation in Speyer decided to rename its church "Church of the Holy Spirit". From then on the church served the united Protestant community.

This happened one year before the actual Union of Churches in the Palatinate. In a survey of about 130,000 Reformed and 108,000 Lutheran Protestants in the parishes of the Palatinate, 40,167 voted for the Union, only 539 against. In the Palatinate, a general synod of Lutheran and Reformed congregations met in Kaiserslautern from 16 August 1818 to determine a common creed. On 1 Advent 1818 (29 November 1818) a union was formed, which was celebrated with a solemn joint divine service.

Until the completion of the Gedächtniskirche (Memorial Church) in 1904, the Trinity Church remained the main Protestant church in Speyer. From 1904 the church services took place only during the winter half-year in the Trinity Church, because the Gedächtniskirche was not heated in winter until 1965 and therefore served only as a summer church.

In 1979 regular church services were stopped in the Heiliggeistkirche. The church services regularly take place only in the Trinity Church.

== Architecture ==
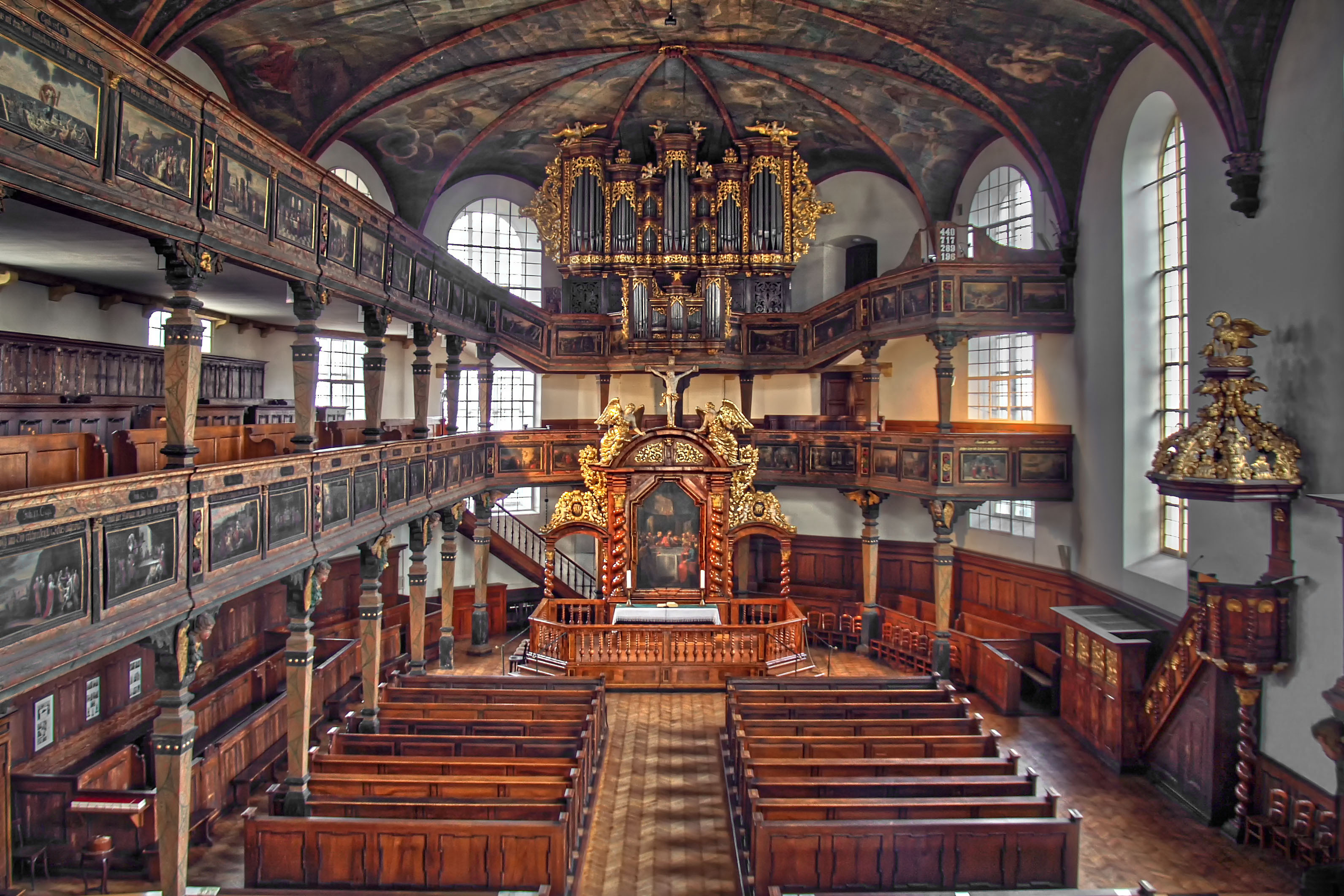
Interior view

The Dreifaltigkeitskirche in Speyer is a baroque building and goes back directly to the St. Catherine's Church in Frankfurt, which was built between 1678 and 1680 by Melchior Heßler. It was built between 1701 and 1717. The master builder was the Mannheim architect Johann Peter Graber. The church is regarded as an "outstanding achievement of Protestant church architecture and a jewel of the Baroque".

The church faces northeast. The roomy hall has a choir end with five sides of a decagon. The walls are unstructured because of the galleries. The wooden ceiling has a very flat cap vault over semicircular shield arches.

The façade is no longer original, as under the French occupation in 1794 the five stone figures were overthrown from the gable of the façade. The current façade gable was redesigned in 1891 according to the plans of the Speyer architect Heinrich Jester.

The interior of the church is entirely from the time of its construction. The ceiling paintings are based on medieval forms of representation. They are all conceived like panel paintings. There is evidence that 20 scenes date back to the picture bible of Matthew Merian. The illustrations of the church scenes serve the understanding and the spreading of the word of God, completely in the sense of the Lutheran faith. In contrast to the usual Baroque ceiling paintings, the paintings are not aligned with a line of sight.

== Organ ==
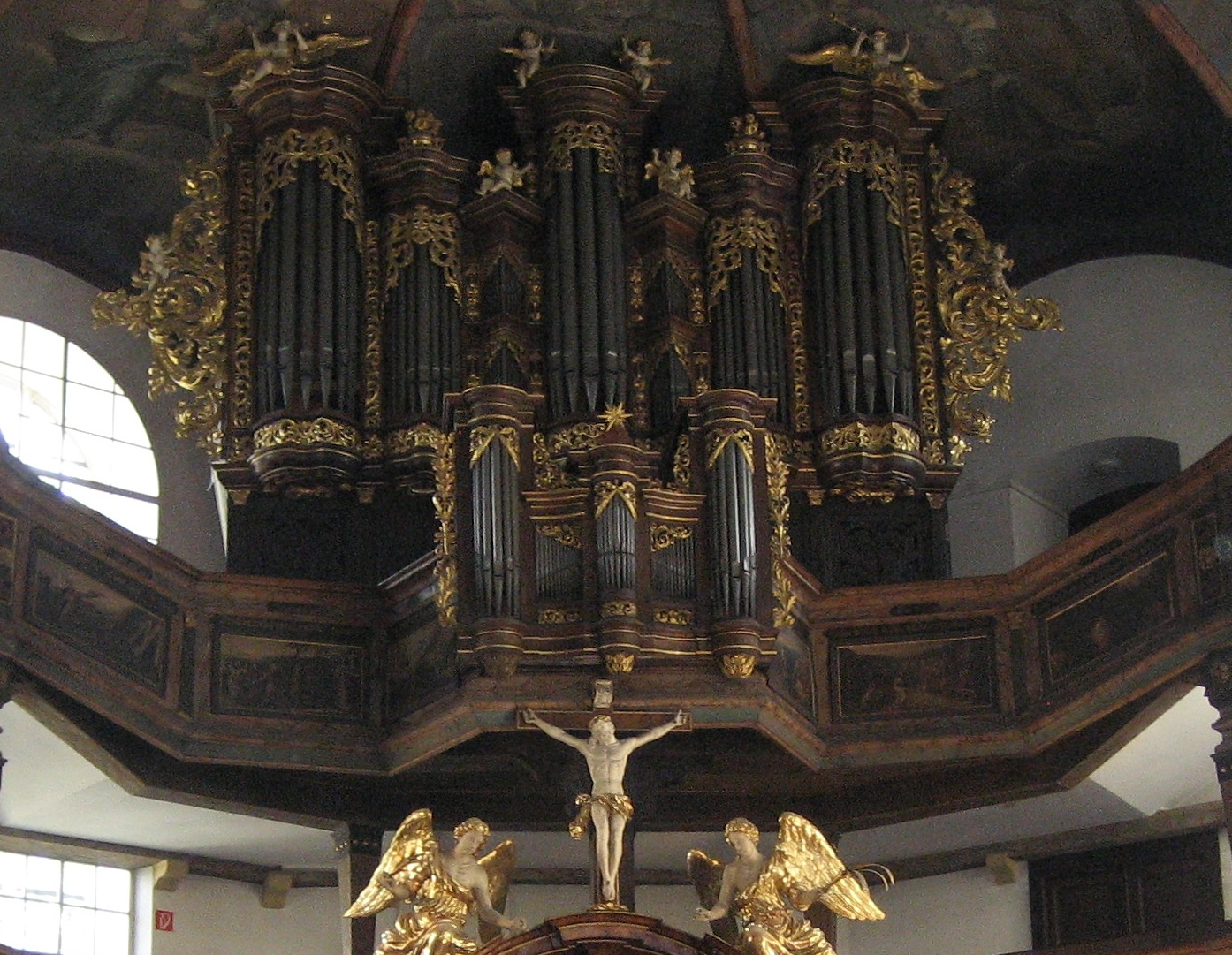
Organ above the altar

The organ of the Trinity Church is located above the altar in the historical prospectus built by Christian Dathan around 1716 for the first organ of the church. The instrument was built in 1929 by the organ building company Steinmeyer (Oettingen), using pipe material from the predecessor organ from 1812, which had been built by Johann Georg Geib (Frankenthal). Today the organ has 41 stops, divided into three manuals and pedal. The instrument has electropneumatic tracker action.

== Bell tower ==
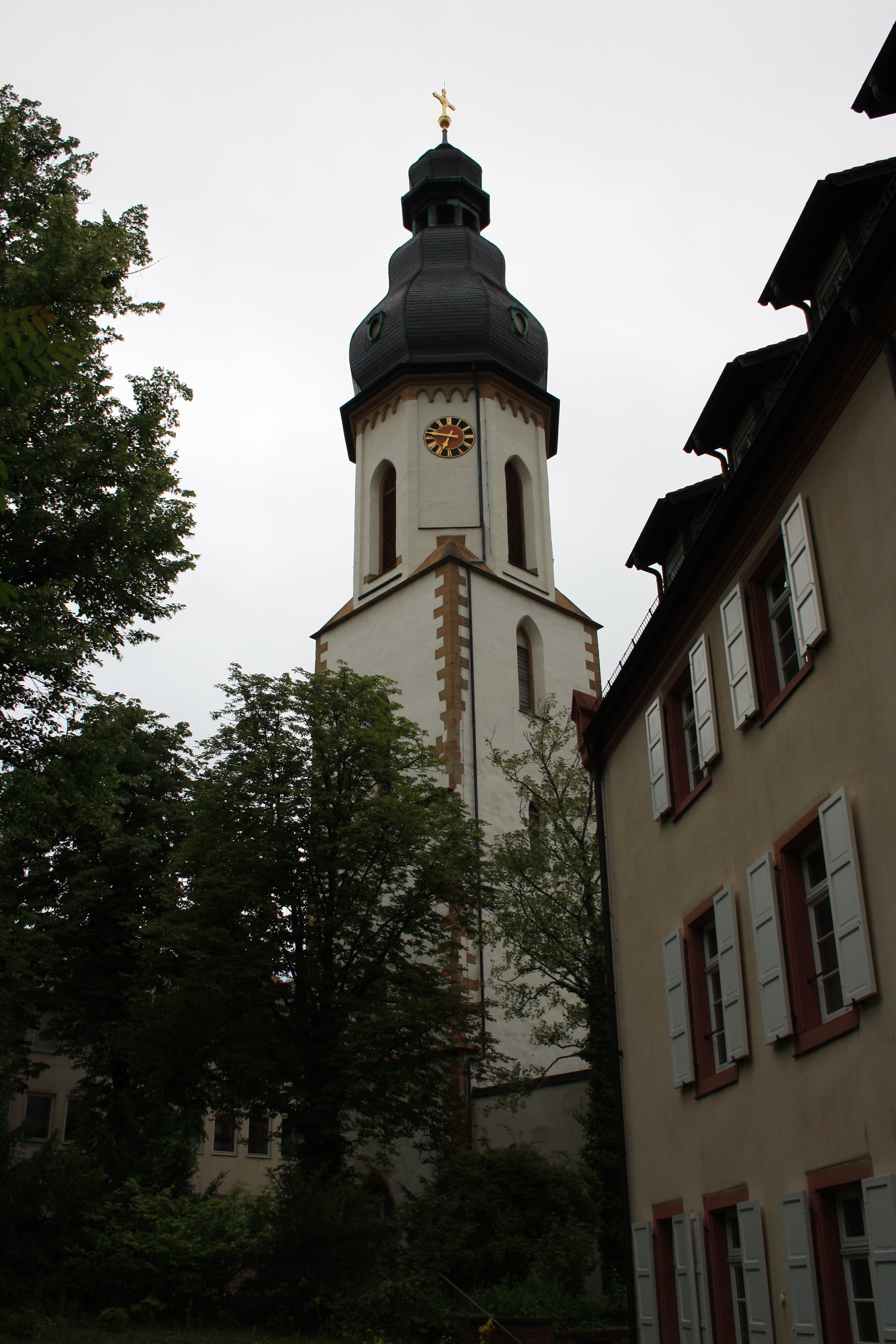
Bell tower

The so-called Läutturm (bell tower) belonged to the medieval St. Georgen Church, of which nothing has survived. Between 1689 and 1822 the tower remained only as a stump. In 1818, the Sprinkhorn et Schrader foundry in Frankenthal cast a three-voiced bell that proved to be too large for the ridge turret of the Trinity Church built in 1717. Therefore, the bell tower was rebuilt to accommodate the new bell. On July 2, 1891, the tower burned including the clock and bells. In the same year Andreas Hamm poured a new bell from Frankenthal with the tones of the C minor triad (c1, es1 and g1), which were thus tuned to the bell of the cathedral. They bore the inscriptions "God's Word Remains for Eternity", "There Is Still Rest in the People of God" and "Rejoice in the Lord All Ways". First they were hung up in a bell house on the church garden and after the reconstruction of the bell tower they had to be ringable; in 1917 the bells had to be collected for war purposes. This was followed in 1924 by three bells from the same foundry, this time in the tones c1 (emergency bell), es1 (faith bell) and f1 (sky bell). In the Second World War, this bell was destroyed. Since 1951, the Vaterunserglocke (Lord's Prayer bell) has hung in clay b1 in the ridge turret of the Dreifaltigkeitskirche itself; it was cast by Friedrich Wilhelm Schilling. In 1964, the Karlsruher Glocken- und Kunstgießerei cast three bells for the bell tower with the same striking tones as the first bell (C minor triad).
