= Theo Kellner =

German artist and architect (1899–1969)

Theo Kellner (13 April 1899 – 26 February 1969) was a German artist and architect active in Berlin, Erfurt and Frankfurt.

After the end of the Second World War, Kellner was involved with the reconstruction of several buildings in Frankfurt, such as the Goethe House and the Church of St Peter, Frankfurt.

== Biography ==
Kellner was a student of artist Lyonel Feininger and architect Hans Poelzig. From 1926 to 1931 he worked in the company Atelier für Architektur in Berlin; from 1932 he worked in Erfurt, East Germany. During the Nazi regime, Kellner was mostly active in heritage conservation. After the conclusion of the war, Theo Kellner became involved in the rebuilding of Frankfurt, often working in collaboration with Wilhelm Massing.

== Projects ==
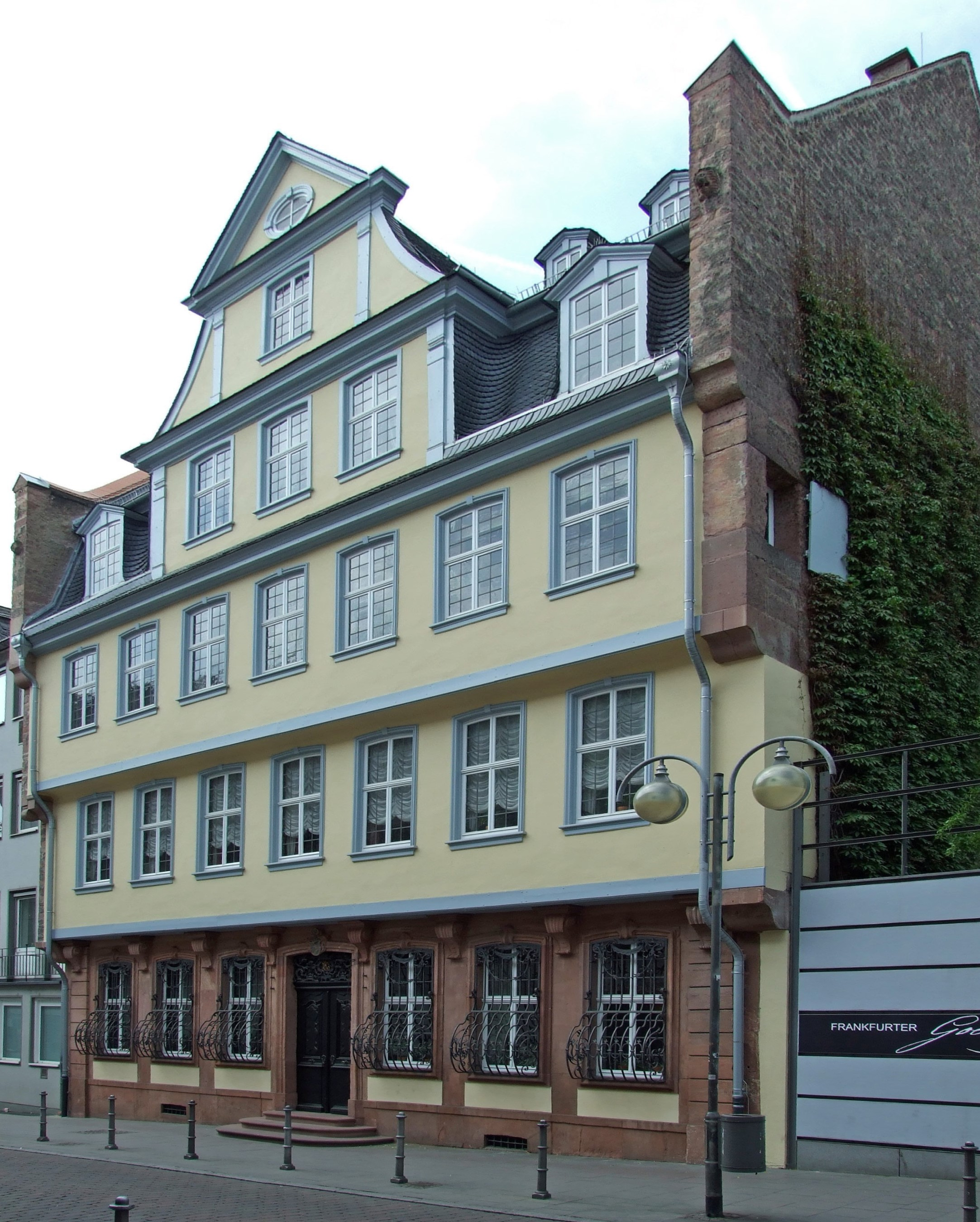
The Goethe House in Frankfurt as rebuilt by Kellner

The following list is a selection of Kellner's projects:

- 1930: Buildings of the Allgemeinen Ortskrankenkasse, Erfurt
- 1935: Residence of Dr Ullrich, Gotha
- 1936–1938: Restoration of the Martin Luther memorial at St. Augustine's Monastery, Erfurt
- 1945–1950; Reconstruction of St Thomas' Church, Erfurt
- 1947: Reconstruction of the Freies Deutsches Hochstift and Goethe House in Frankfurt
- 1950–1954: Reconstruction of the Hauptwache, Frankfurt
- 1950–1954: Reconstruction of the Church of St Catherine, Frankfurt
- 1959–1965: Reconstruction of the Church of St Peter, Frankfurt
