= Melchior Heßler =

German engineer and master builder

Melchior Heßler (c. 1619 – 18 April 1690) was a German engineer and master builder (architect and builder).

== Early life ==
Born in Mehlis, Heßler was engineer of the artillery and entered the service of the free imperial city Frankfurt am Main, probably 1661 as Stückleutnant and Stadtbaumeister. The letter of service is dated from 29 May 1675.

== Professional career ==
His main duty was maintenance of existing buildings. New buildings were the Frankfurt defense system. Construction began in 1627 after designs by Johann Wilhelm Dilich, and the Katharinenkirche, the first Protestant new church in Frankfurt after the Reformation, built from 1678 to 1681. The hall church has some Gothic elements, such as the windows and the piers), and Baroque, such as the portals and the canopy (welsche Haube) of the steeple. It is focused on the sermon (Predigtkirche), with many paintings of biblical scenes, and became a model for other Protestant churches such as the Dreifaltigkeitskirche in Speyer (1701–1717) and the Dreifaltigkeitskirche in Worms (1709–1725).

== Death ==
Heßler died in Frankfurt.

== Literature ==
- Wolfgang Klötzer (ed.): Frankfurter Biographie. Personengeschichtliches Lexikon. Vol. I, A–L. Waldemar Kramer, Frankfurt am Main 1994, ISBN 3-7829-0444-3.
