= Stephani =

Stephani is a given name and surname, and may refer to:

== Given Name ==
- Stephani Fernando (born 1971), Sri Lankan politician
- Stephani Goldwin (1917-2006) English painter and illustrator
- Stephani Hatch, American sociologist
- Stephani Nampiina (born 2000) Ugandan cricketer
- Stephani Perry (born 1970), American science fiction and horror writer
- Stephani Sherlock (born 1996), British rhythmic gymnast
- Stephani Victor (born 1969), American paralympican alpine skier

== Surname ==
- Franz Stephani (1842-1927), German bryologist
- Frederick Stephani (1903-1962), Flim director
- Hans Stephani (1935-2003), German physiciat
- Hermann Stephani (1877-1960), German musicologist
- Martin Stephani (born 1915), German conductor and professor
- Paul Michael Stephani (1944-1998), American serial killer
- Photis Stephani (born 1971), Cypriot pole vaulter
- William Stephani (died 1420s), Scottish diplomat
