= Church of St Peter, Frankfurt =

Church in Frankfurt, Hesse, Germany

Coordinates: 50.1175°N 8.6838°E

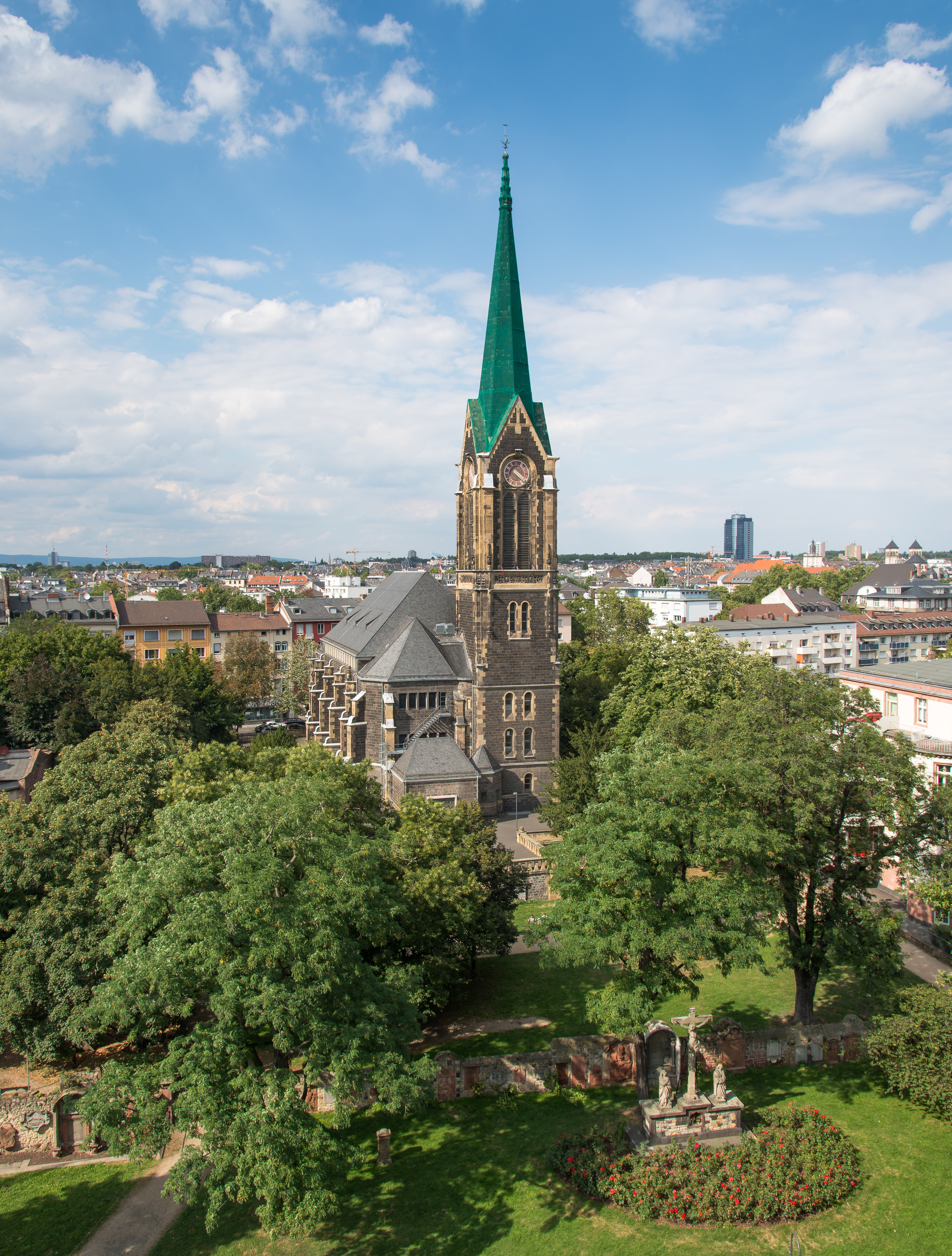
The church as viewed from the south

The Church of St Peter (German: Peterskirche) is a former evangelical church located in the Innenstadt area of Frankfurt, Germany. It has been known as jugend-kultur-kirche sankt peter since 2007, when it became a youth centre.

The church built between 1891 and 1894 on a neo-Renaissance design by Hans Grisebach and Georg Dinklage.It was built on the site of the historic St Peter's Churchyard (German: Peterskirchhof), where most of Frankfurt's dead was buried until 1828.

== History ==
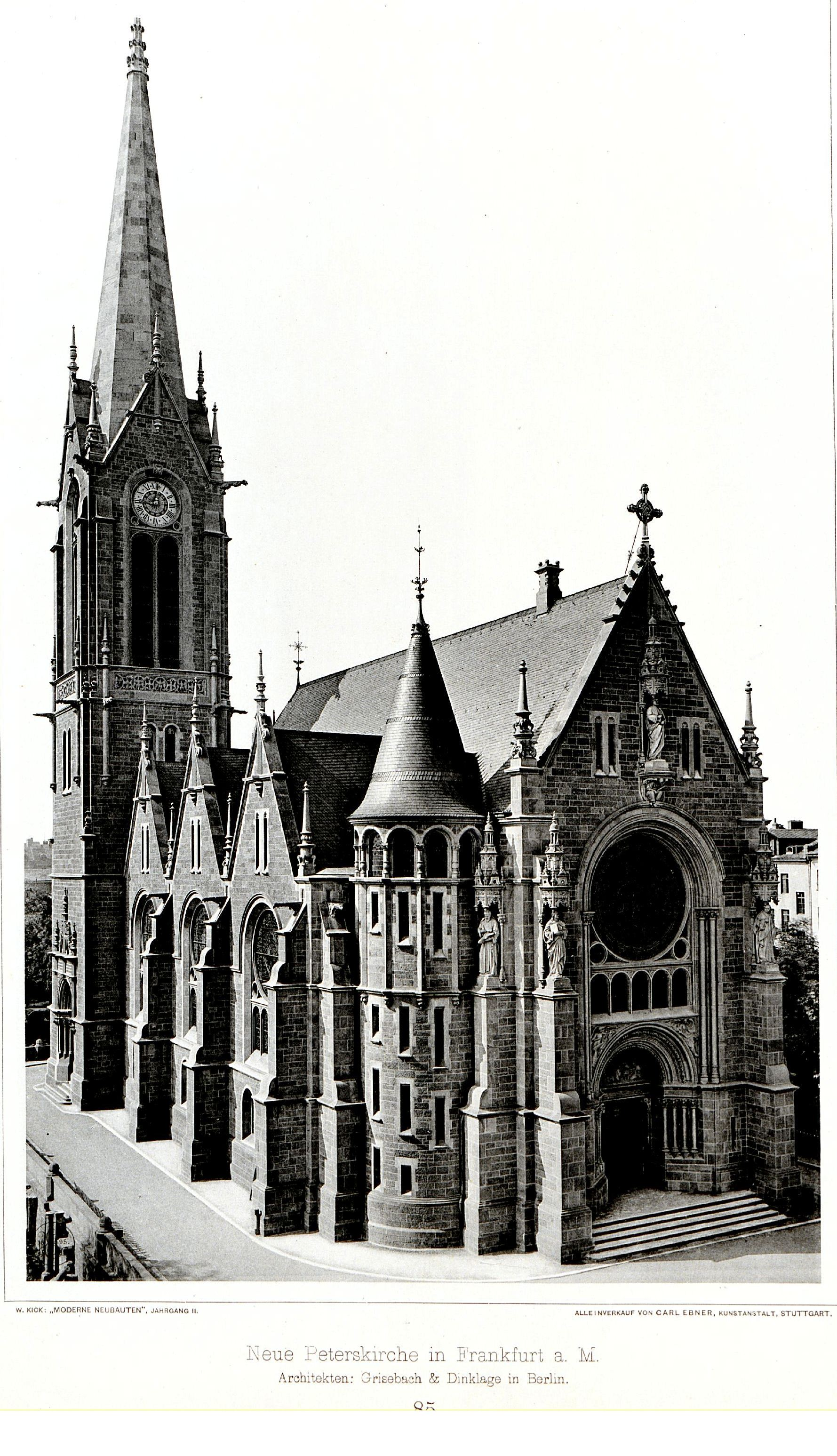
The church in 1898

There had been a smaller church in the Peterskirchhof since 1381. In August 1889, the Frankfurt municipality decided to tear down this church, although the building was not actually destroyed until 1895. In the meantime, the current Church was built to the north-west of the previous one.

The Church of St Peter was designed by Hans Grisebach and Georg Dinklage, two architects from Berlin. They designed a hall church in the style of eclecticism, a combination of different historical styles. The 68 metre-high spire of the church was the tallest building in the area at the time of its construction.

=== Reconstruction ===
On 22 March 1944, the church was damaged in a bombing raid of Frankfurt. The church was repaired by the architects Theo Kellner (who had led the reconstruction of the Goethe House) and Wilhelm Massing between 1961 and 1965. It was rededicated on 6 June 1965.

=== Deconsecration ===
The church was used by the evangelical "Parish of St Peter" (German: Petersgemeinde) until 2002, when the parish was merged with the neighbouring "Parish of the Epiphany" (German: Epiphaniasgemeinde). Church services for the parish have since been held exclusively in the Church of the Epiphany.

In June 2004, building work began at the church, to transform it into a youth and events centre. An event hall with 1000 seats replaced the former nave, and seminar rooms and a cafeteria were set up in the east wing.

The building work was financed by the city government (the owners of the church) in partnership with the Evangelical Church. The church was reopened as jugend-kultur-kirche sankt peter in December 2007, two years later than originally planned and at a total cost of over five million euros.

== Churchyard ==
=== Notable interments ===
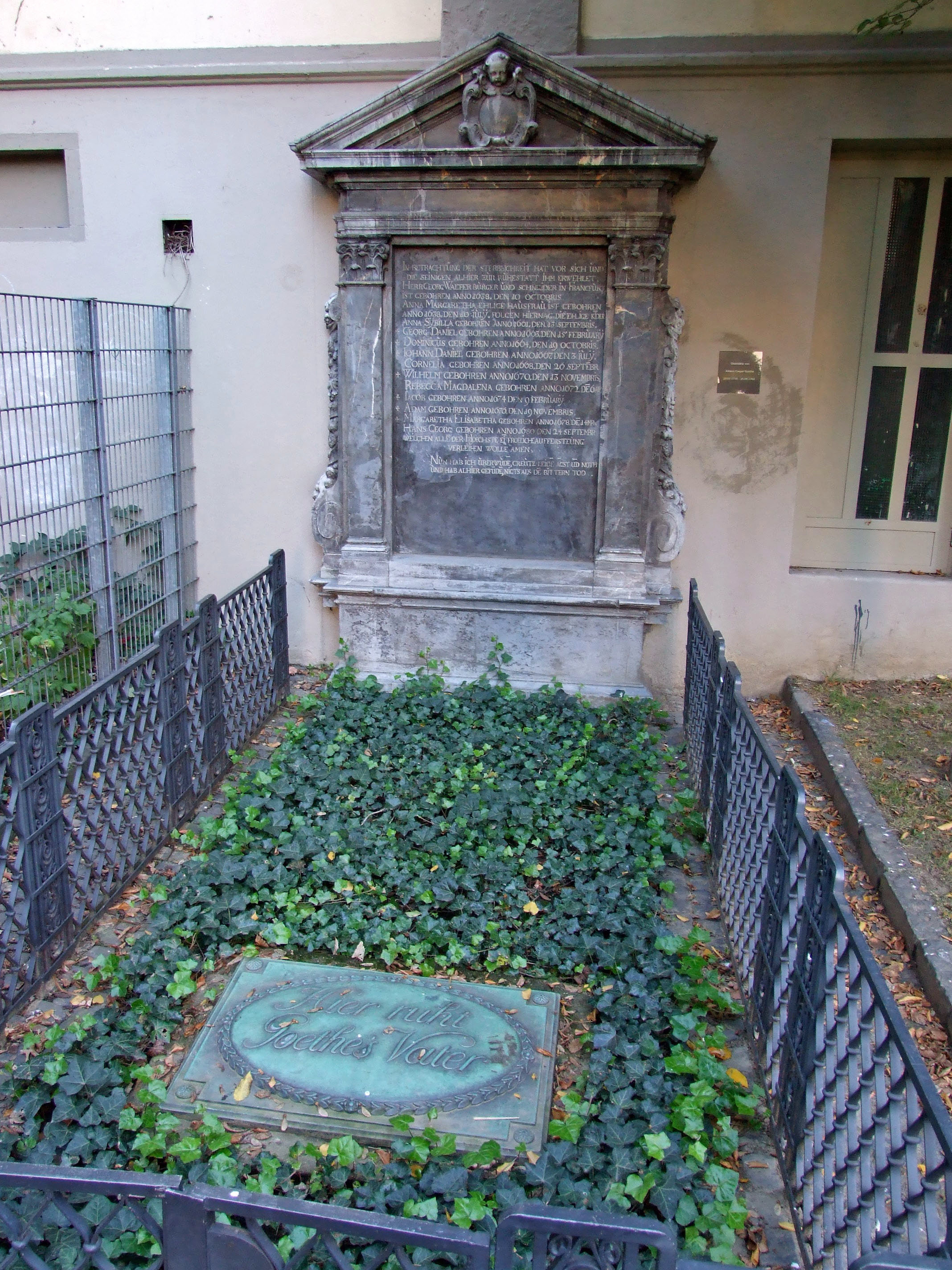
Johann Caspar Goethe's grave in the Peterskirchhof

Notable interments in the churchyard include:

- Christian Egenolff (1502–1555), one of the first printers operating in Frankfurt
- Matthäus Merian the Elder (1593–1650), Swiss-born engraver and publisher
- Matthäus Merian the Younger (1621–1687), Swiss-born engraver and portrait painter
- Johann Friedrich Städel (1728–1816), banker and founder of the Städel Museum
- Johann Caspar Goethe (1710–1782) and Catharina Elisabeth Goethe (1731–1808), parents of the poet and playwright Johann Wolfgang von Goethe
