= Martin Lücker =

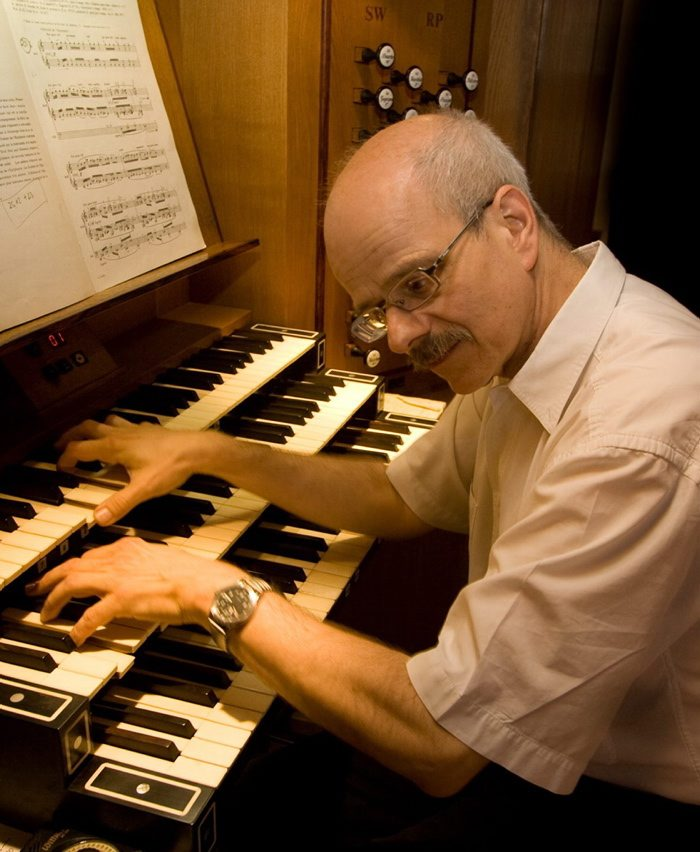
- At the organ of the Katharinenkirche, Frankfurt, December 2008
- Born: 11 October 1953 (age 71); Preußisch Oldendorf, Germany
- Occupations: Classical organist; Professor
- Organizations: Katharinenkirche, Frankfurt; Hochschule für Musik und Darstellende Kunst Frankfurt am Main; Figuralchor Frankfurt

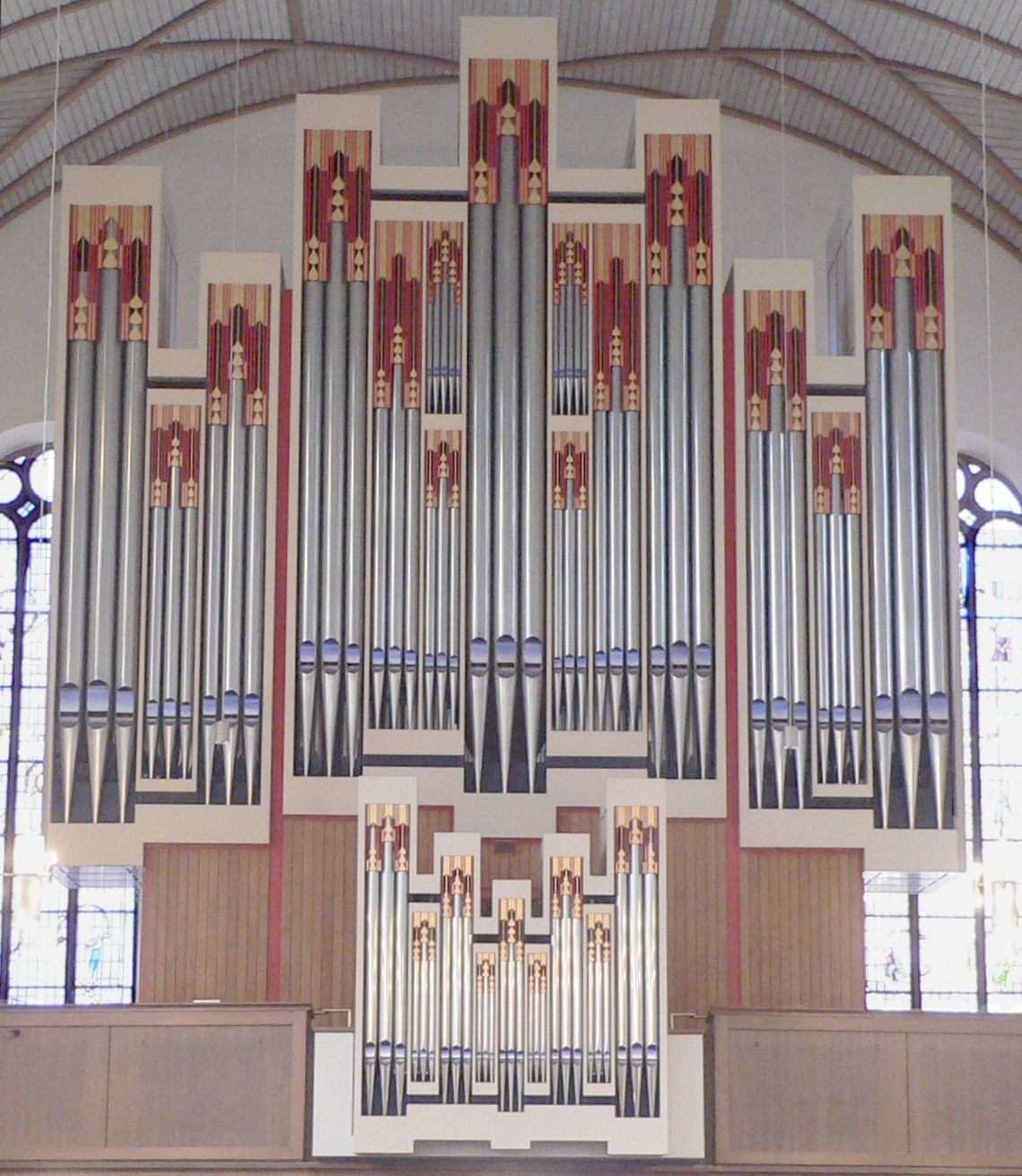
Prospect of the organ, 1990

Martin Lücker (born 11 October 1953) is a German classical organist, and professor at the Hochschule für Musik und Darstellende Kunst Frankfurt am Main.

== Career ==
Born in Preußisch Oldendorf, Lücker studied organ in Hannover and in Vienna with Anton Heiller, and conducting in Detmold with Martin Stephani. He first worked there at the Landestheater Detmold as repetiteur, then as assistant of the choir director at the Oper Frankfurt.

Since 1983, he has been organist of the main Protestant church of Frankfurt, the Katharinenkirche. He has been professor of Künstlerisches Orgelspiel und Methodik/Didaktik des Orgelunterrichtes (concert organ playing and didactic of teaching organ playing) at the Hochschule für Musik und Darstellende Kunst Frankfurt am Main since 1998. From August 2011 to 2016, he was also the conductor of the Figuralchor Frankfurt.

At the Katharinenkirche, he established two regular concert series. In "30 Minuten Orgelmusik" (30 minutes of organ music“, every Monday and Thursday at 4:30 pm he plays a 30-minute free concert; he played his 3000th concert in 2013. In "Musik in Sankt Katharinen" (Music in Saint Catharine's), he plays two organ concerts a month, played by himself and guests, and choral music with the Kantorei St. Katharinen.

In 2012, he played a concert at the historic Stumm organ of the Rheingauer Dom with a program that Albert Schweitzer had performed in Frankfurt in 1928 on a similar instrument that had been destroyed. He celebrated his 30th anniversary at the Katharinenkirche with a concert.

== Recordings ==
- Johann Sebastian Bach, Leipziger Spätwerke. Hänssler CD 92.100
- Johann Sebastian Bach, Eine Weimarer Tonleiter. Hänssler CD 92.091
- Das Frankfurter Orgelbuch, Sieben zeitgenössische Orgelstücke, Melisma MELI 7114-2
- Works by Bach, Vivaldi, Stanley and others with Reinhold Friedrich (trumpet) and Hartmut Friedrich (trombone). Capriccio 10483
