= St Thomas' Church, Erfurt =

St Thomas' Church
- German: Thomaskirche
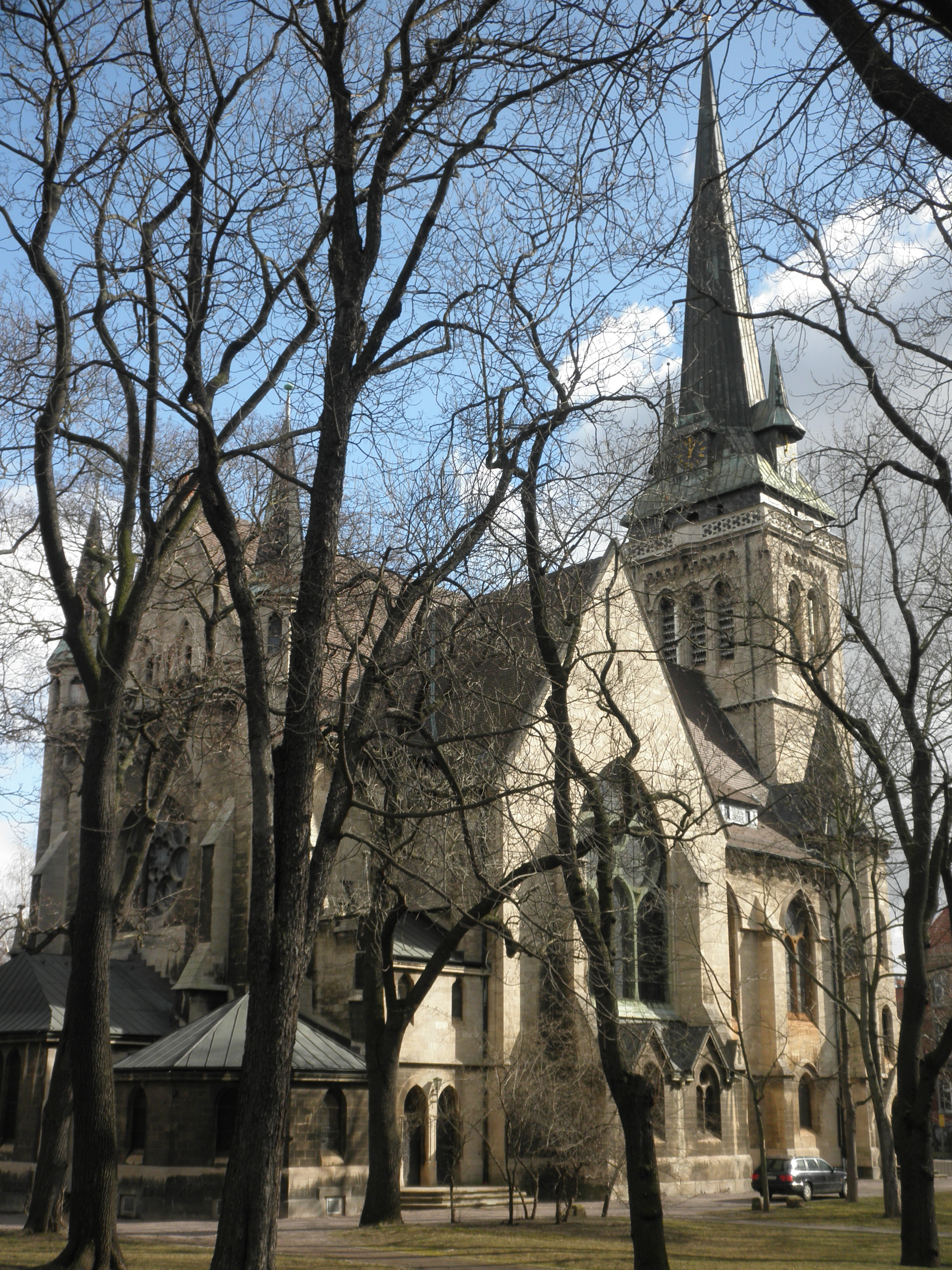

- Location within Thuringia Location within Germany
- 50°58′03″N 11°01′39″E
- Location: Erfurt, Thuringia
- Address: Schillerstraße; 99084
- Country: Germany
- Language: German
- Denomination: United Protestant
- Website: www.thomasgemeinde-erfurt.de

History
- Status: Parish church
- Dedication: Thomas the Apostle
- Consecrated: 15 June 1902 (first); 24 September 2000 (last)

Architecture
- Heritage designation: Kulturdenkmal in Thuringia
- Style: Gothic Revival
- Years built: 1900–1902

Administration
- Province: Protestant Church in Central Germany

St Thomas' Church (German: Thomaskirche) in the city of Erfurt in Thuringia, Germany, is a United Protestant parish church. It was built in Gothic Revival style in a park on Schillerstraße in the Löbervorstadt district in 1900–1902 to replace the Old St Thomas' Church, which had become too small. It has the second-highest steeple in the city at 72 metres (236 ft) and houses a Gothic altar retable from 1445, which is one of Erfurt's four valuable carved altars.

== History ==
=== Old St Thomas' Church ===
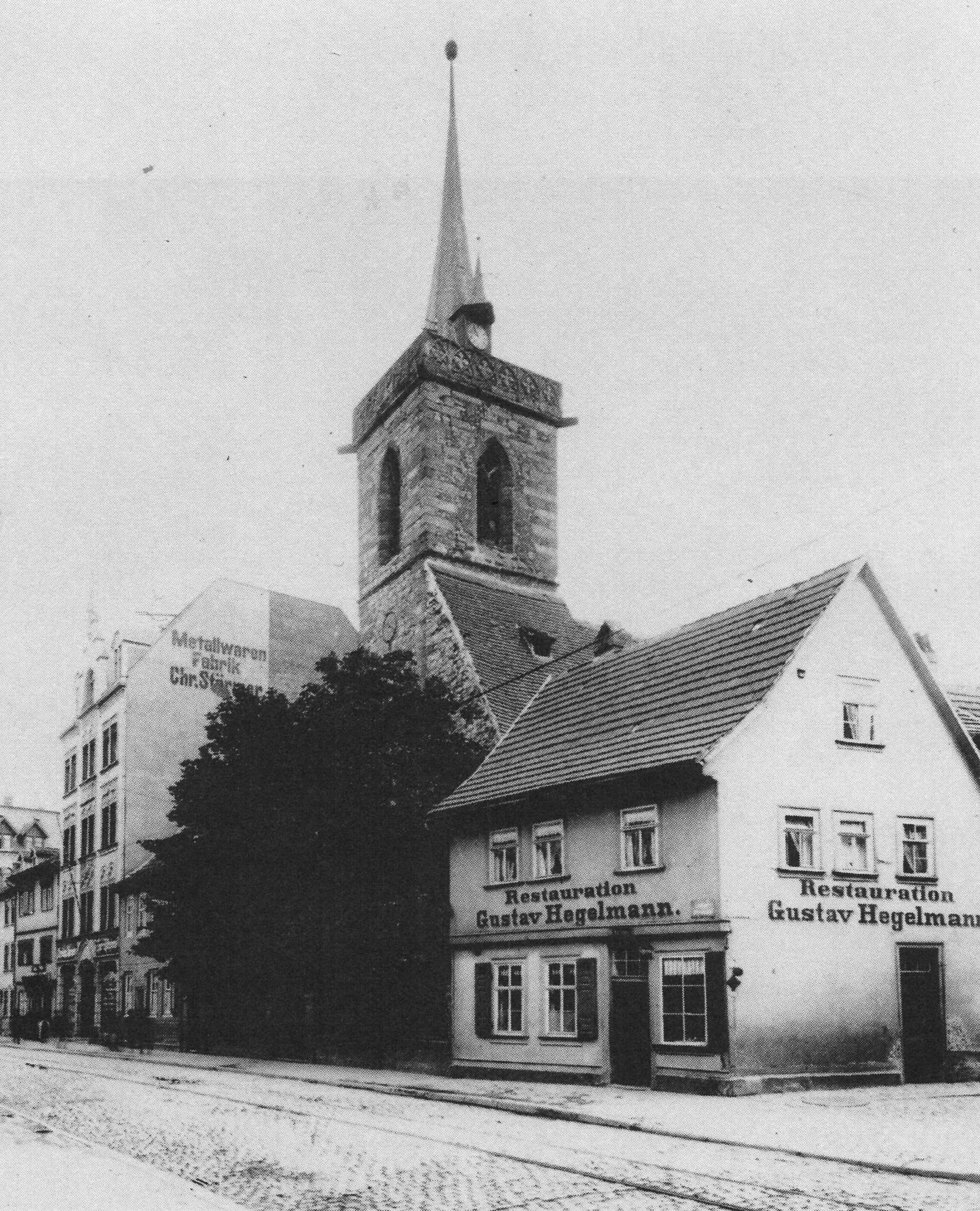
Old St Thomas' Church (1899)

The Old St Thomas' Church was a Gothic aisleless church on the junction of Löberstraße and Rosengasse streets and served as the Protestant parish church of the Löbervorstadt district until its demolition in 1903. The parish extended between the inner and outer city walls in the south of Erfurt until it was defortified in 1872. During the Middle Ages, this area was mainly inhabited by poorer people, such as day labourers, porters as well as the Löber people, who practised the craft of tanning and gave the district its name. For this reason, the Old St Thomas' Church was one of the smallest church buildings in the city with simple architecture and only a few precious inventory items, such as the carved altar from 1445. The Old St Thomas' Church was first mentioned in writing in a document in 1282. It was probably rebuilt in the Gothic style in the first half of the 14th century. It remained in this form until it was demolished, making it one of the very few churches in Erfurt that did not undergo any major structural changes, either as a result of city fires or due to dilapidation. After Erfurt was defortified in 1872, the Löbervorstadt district moved southwards, whereupon numerous new residential buildings were erected between the Flutgraben ditch and the Steigerwald forest from 1890 onwards, and the Old St Thomas' Church no longer offered enough space for the growing congregation. In addition, many wealthy citizens settled in the quarter, who wished for a more representative and centrally located parish church. In this way, St Thomas' parish had developed from what was once the smallest and poorest to one of the largest and richest parishes in Erfurt.

=== Today's St Thomas' Church ===
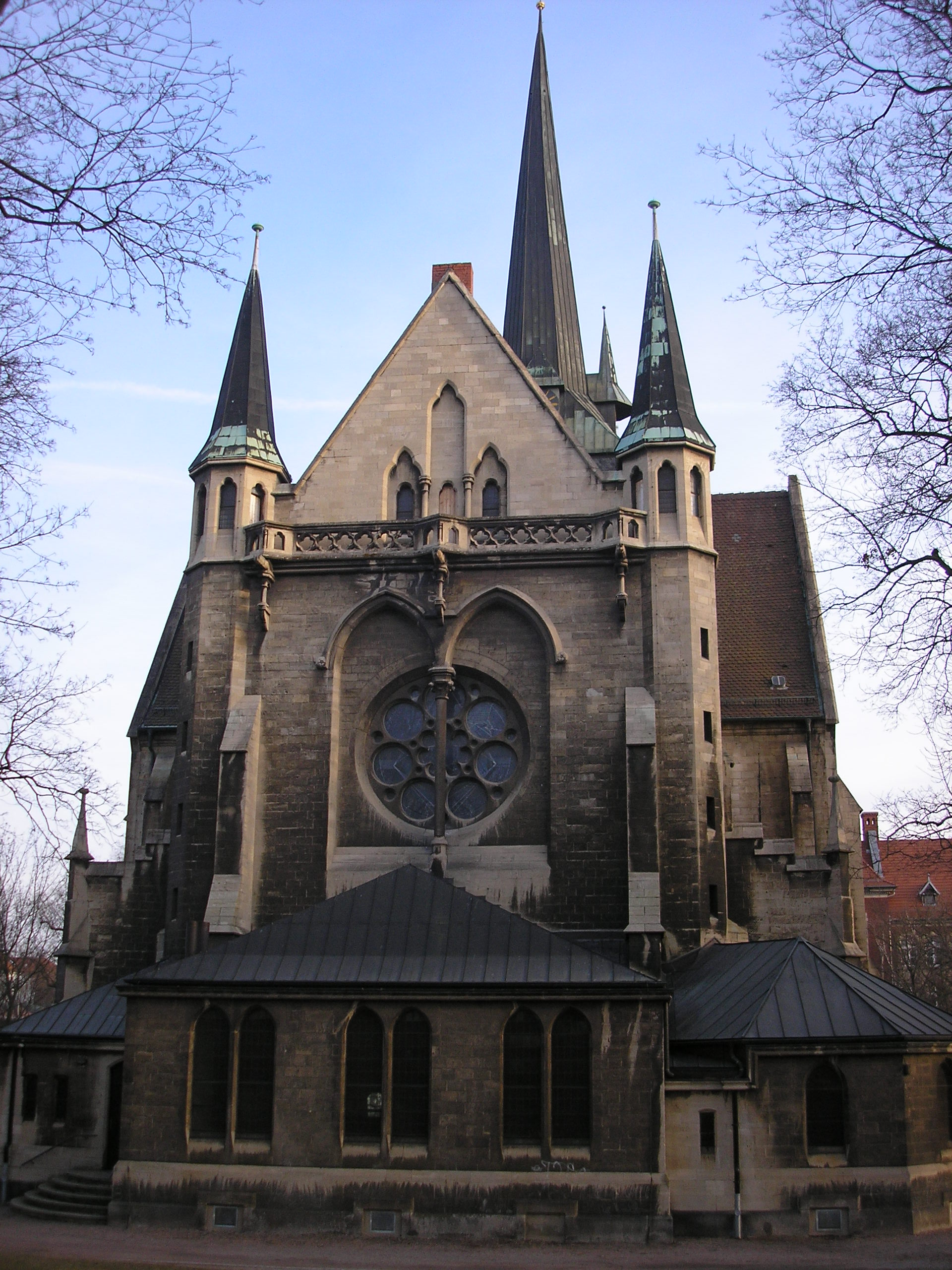
View from south

After the groundbreaking for the New St Thomas' Church on 29 April 1900, work began on a new neo-Gothic building in a park on Schillerstraße street under the direction of the pastor Alfred Fritzsche and the Hanoverian architect Rudolph Eberhard Hillebrand. They had decided on a northern orientation of the church, parallel to Viktoriastraße (today's Puschkinstraße), in order to escape the traffic noise in Schillerstraße. Master mason Ferdinand Schmidt and master stonemason C. Walther were responsible for the exterior work and decorative painter Alexander Linnemann for the interior painting and design of the coloured glazing. After two years of construction, the New St Thomas' Church, with room for about 1,100 visitors, was consecrated in a celebratory service on 15 June 1902. In return, the old St Thomas' Church was demolished a year later and previously, valuable furnishings, such as the altar retable from 1445 and a sacrament house, were taken over into the new building. However, the retable was not placed on the altar as in the Old St Thomas' Church, but was kept in the church hall next door.

On the site of the Old St Thomas' Church, on today's Löberstraße 18 plot, a multi-storey row house was built, whose name, Haus zum St. Thomas ("House of St Thomas"), is still a reminder of its sacred predecessor. Between 1910 and 1913, the parish and community hall was built between St Thomas' Church and Puschkinstraße. At the beginning of the 1930s, the altar retable from 1445, which had been painted over with new colours in the 19th century, was restored to its original state by the state conservator Albert Leusch from Halle an der Saale. In 1902, all three bells of the Old St Thomas' Church were melted down and replaced by the small "Luther", medium "Thomas" and large "Christus" bells, the smaller of which was confiscated in 1917 and replaced by a new casting in 1926. The larger bells had to be surrendered during the Second World War, so that only the small "Luther bell" was available until the 1950s.

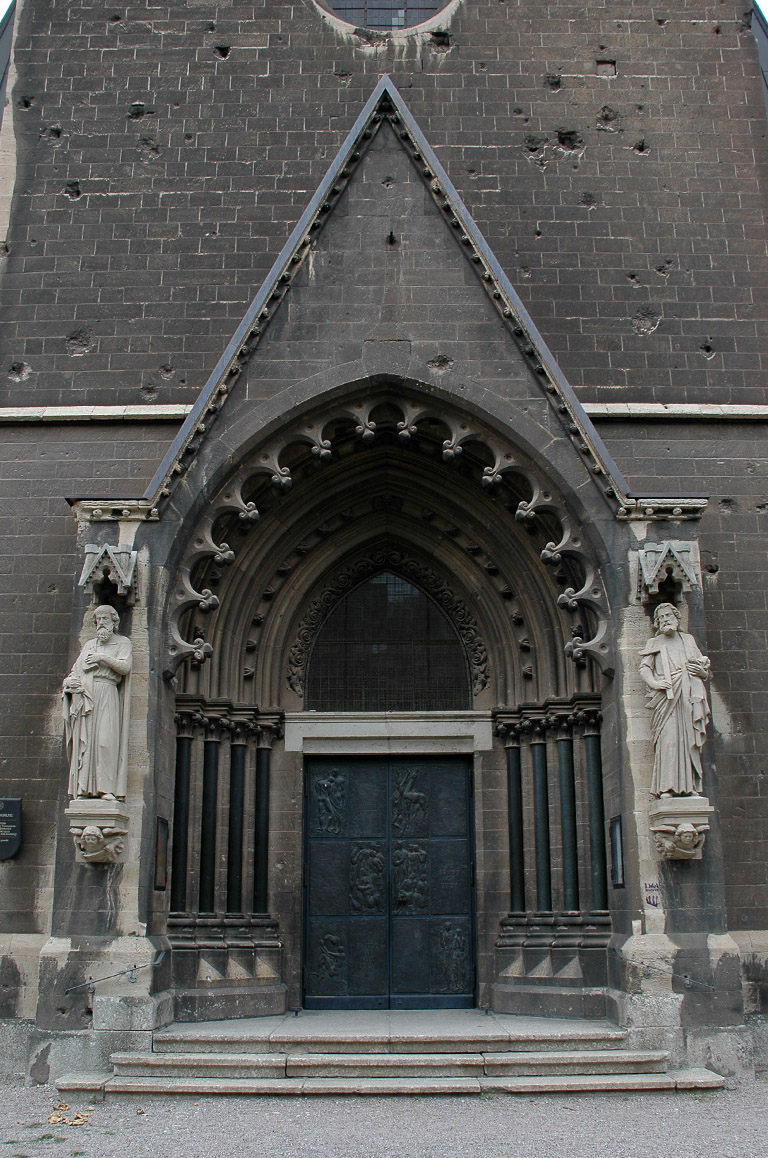
South portal with bomb fragment impacts (2007)

On the morning of 31 March 1945, three squadrons of the 3rd Air Division of the United States Army Air Forces (USAAF), consisting of numerous B-17 bombers, reached the city of Erfurt and began an air raid on the central and southern city region. Explosive bombs hit the eastern nave of St Thomas' Church and severely damaged the roof and the outer wall in this area. Inside, the vaults, the galleries, the Walcker organ and the interior painting were badly damaged. Furthermore, all the panes of the church windows were broken and the statue of Christ above the main portal was lost. Internal USAAF reports later revealed that this air raid had originally been intended for the town of Gotha and that, due to poor visibility on that day, a target confusion had taken place.

As a result of the severe damage, the Thomas congregation could no longer use their church for services and had to relocate to the Old-Lutheran Christuskirche (Christ Church) in Tettaustraße street. Despite adverse conditions, St Thomas' Church could be rebuilt according to designs by the architects Theo Kellner and Karl Tetzner under the supervision of the pastors Kurt Pohl and Johannes Mebus and was re-consecrated on 24 September 1950. During this process, various changes were made to the interior of the church; for example, the retable from 1445 was rearranged on the altar table and a very simple colour scheme was chosen for the interior painting. In 1947 and 1956, coloured glass windows were installed, which had been manufactured by the workshop of Ernst Kraus in Weimar according to designs by the graphic artist Karl Völker from Halle an der Saale. Between 1955 and 1957, the altar was built from Seeberg sandstone. The baptismal lid, the altar cross and the altar chandelier from 1952 were made by Helmut Griese. On 15 March 1957, four new steel bells were delivered from the Schilling foundry in Apolda and named Christus, Thomas, Luther and Menius by Bishop Johannes Jänicke from Magdeburg on 29 September. The large bell had to be removed in 1959 because of a crack, but could be replaced three years later by a new casting donated by the then church president Martin Niemöller. In 1974, twelve bronze relief plates for the door of the main portal were donated by the pastors Johannes Mebus and Kurt Pohl and cast according to the designs of the Berlin sculptor Werner Stötzer. However, these plaques could only be installed many years later. On 21 December 1998, the day of St Thomas the Apostle, the new main portal was inaugurated. The pipe organ, which was newly built in 1950, could only be completed in 1993 by the organ-building workshop Schuke from Potsdam and has since been one of the largest organs in Erfurt.

During the time of the GDR, the church was in permanent decay due to the persistent lack of building materials, so that the roof was in a very poor condition by the early 1980s. Finally, in 1987, the roof of the church could be renovated with red roof tiles thanks to material donations from West Germany. In 1994, the Freundeskreis Thomaskirche Erfurt e. V. ("Circle of Friends of St Thomas' Church, Erfurt") association was founded, which has since been committed to the renovation and maintenance of the church and is made up of parishioners and interested citizens. In January 2000, St Thomas' Church was renovated by the architectural firm of Hardt, Scheler und Partner and in the process, the 4.5-metre-high (14 ft 9 in) rose window on the north wall, which had been bricked up in 1945, was restored and fitted with new glazing based on designs by Susanne Precht from Lauscha. Furthermore, the interior was repainted and the altar area was enlarged for choir and orchestra events. During the renovation work, services were held in the Catholic Neuwerkskirche of the partner parish Crucis–St. Wigbert. The church was re-consecrated on 24 September 2000, the fiftieth anniversary of its re-consecration after reconstruction. In 2003, the chapel was renovated and the Thomasstiftung ("Thomas Foundation") was established under the umbrella of the Freundeskreis. It is administered by a foundation board consisting of three members of the Freundeskreis. The "Thomas Foundation" organises, for example, musical events for the church.

== Architecture and interior ==
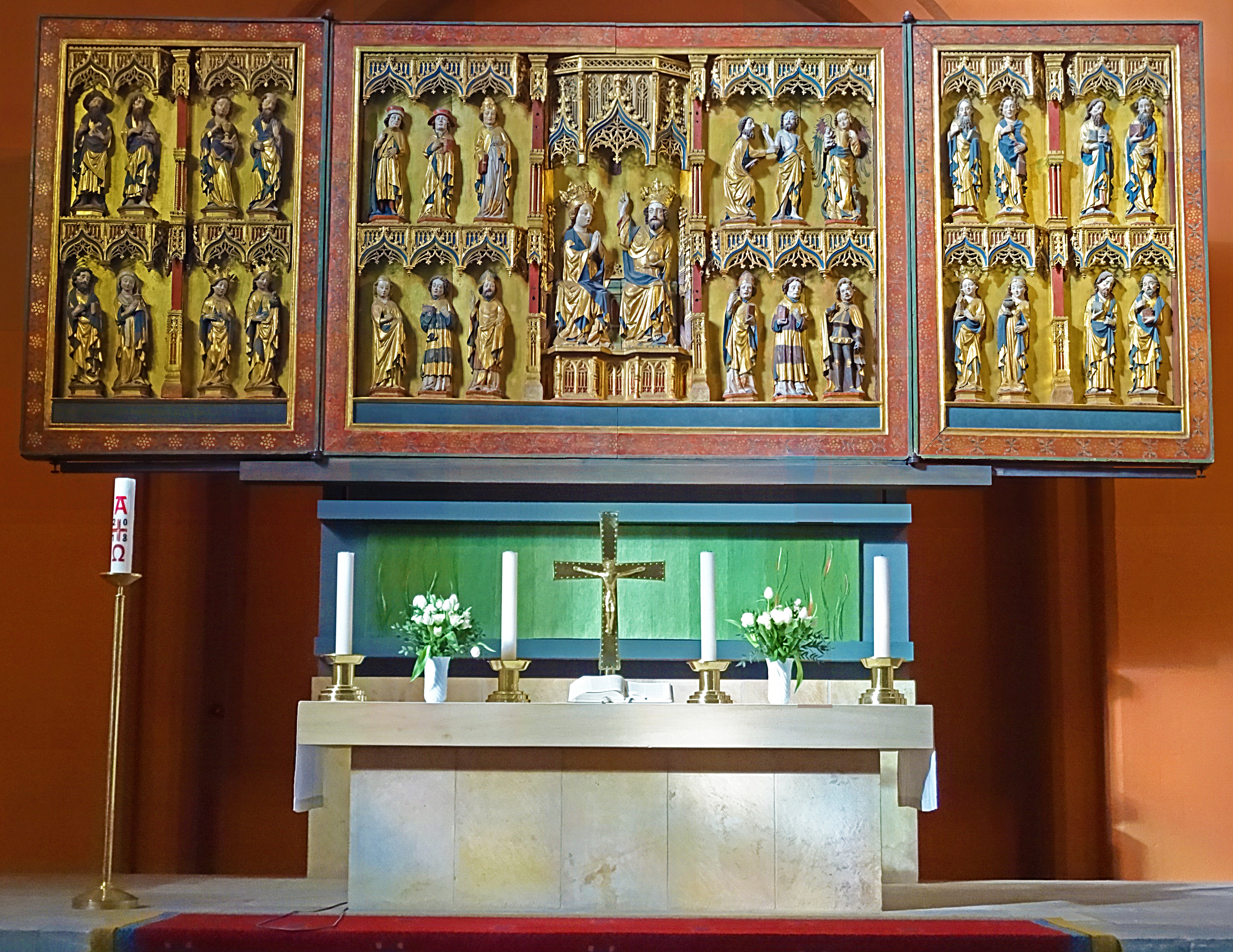
The winged retable (open)

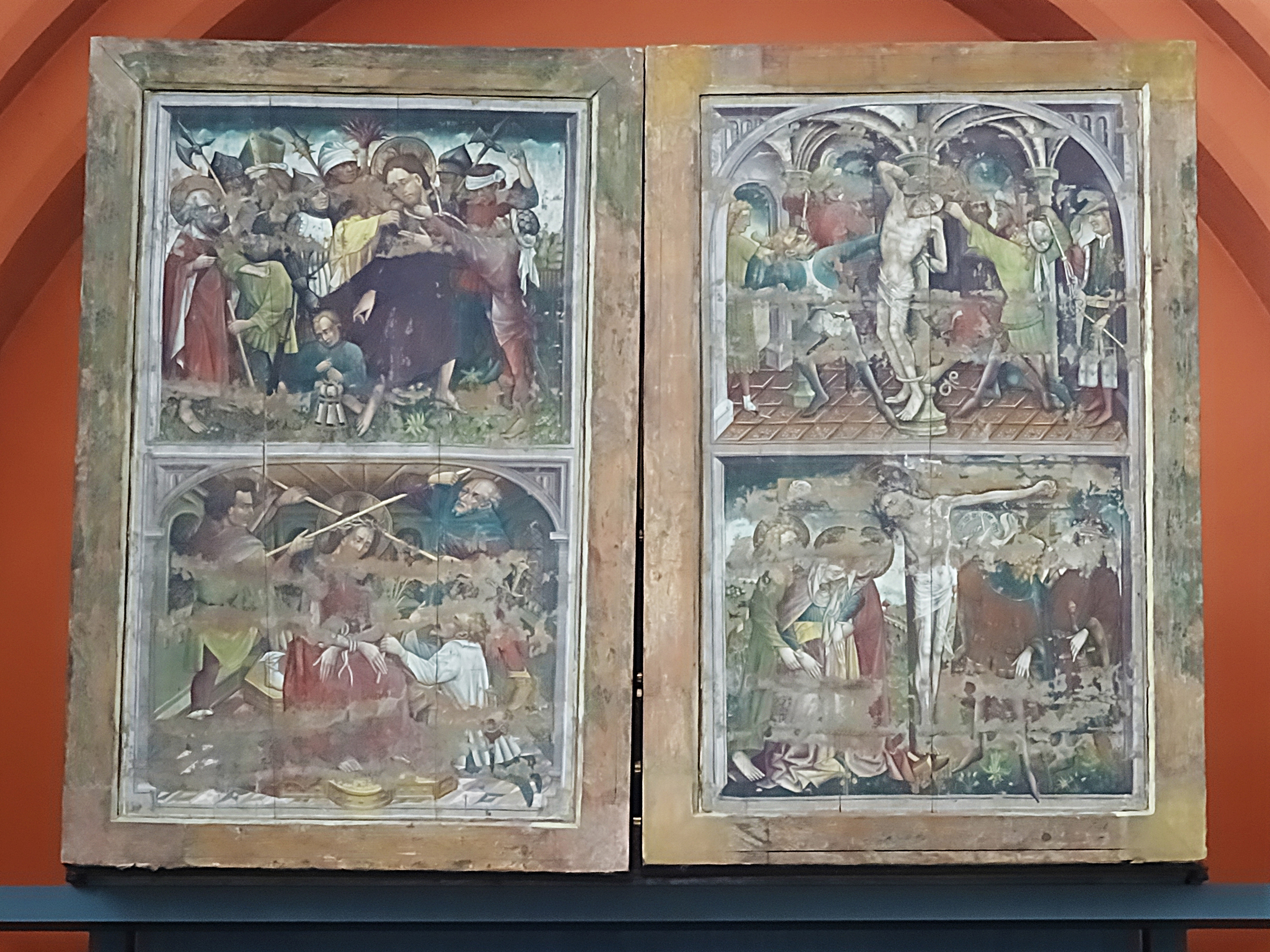
The winged retable (closed)

St Thomas' Church is a single-nave, cruciform church in the neo-Gothic style, 51.2 metres (168 ft 0 in) long and 28.0 metres (91 ft 10 in) wide. The gable roof has a height of 25.6 metres (84 ft 0 in) and the surrounding walls are made of bricks faced with limestone. In the south rises the church tower, which has a rectangular base and, with its height of 72 metres (236 ft), is one of the highest among Erfurt's churches. Inside, it contains a four-part chime and has several pointed-arched windows at the height of the bells. It is topped by a stone gallery and an octagonal, copper-roofed spire which, modelled on the Old St Thomas' Church, bears a tower clock with a spire on top in each compass direction. The nave seats a total of 2000 people and, unlike many other churches, the main altar is oriented to the north. Adjacent to the north side of the church are a chapel and a church hall whose vaulted cellar is used, among other things, as a band rehearsal room. The main portal in the south, also called Thomasportal, is flanked on the left by a statue of St Paul and on the right by a statue of St Thomas with a canopy and is decorated on each side by four columns. Originally, there was a figure of Christ above the portal, which was lost, however, during the bombing on Holy Saturday 1945. The door of the main portal is divided into twelve sections, each of which is decorated with a bronze relief plate designed by Werner Stötzer and depicting various scenes from the life of the apostle Thomas. Among them, for example, is the encounter between Thomas and the resurrected Christ (John 20) as well as Thomas' confession "My Lord and my God" (John 20:28).

After passing through the main portal, one first reaches the tower basement, which also serves as an entrance hall and provides access to the organ gallery above via two staircases. To the north of the tower adjoins the nave, which, starting from the organ, is flanked on the left and right by a stone gallery. On the north wall of the eastern gallery hangs a sculpture of Christ nailed to a cross, created by the Erfurt artist Hans Walter in 1952. It is intended to commemorate the destruction of the church by bombs and its reconstruction despite difficult conditions. One of the most precious treasures of St Thomas' Church is a three-winged retable from 1445, six metres (19 ft 8 in) wide and 2.3 metres (7 ft 7 in) high, which stands on the altar. It belongs to the ensemble of four valuable Erfurt carved altars and was probably donated between 1440 and 1448 by the Archbishop of Mainz, Dietrich Schenk von Erbach. In the centre of the retable, the Coronation of Mary by Christ is depicted, and in the upper row to the right of it, the encounter of St Thomas with Christ. Since a restoration, the wings are movable again; they are closed during the Passion weeks to reveal the backs which show scenes from the Passion of Christ. To the left of the altar on the east wall is a sacrament house from 1440, donated by Hans Heilwig in memory of his wife Künne von Milwitz, and to the right on the west wall is a relief of St Thomas the Apostle from 1440, showing St Thomas and his coat of arms, a dog with an arm in its mouth.

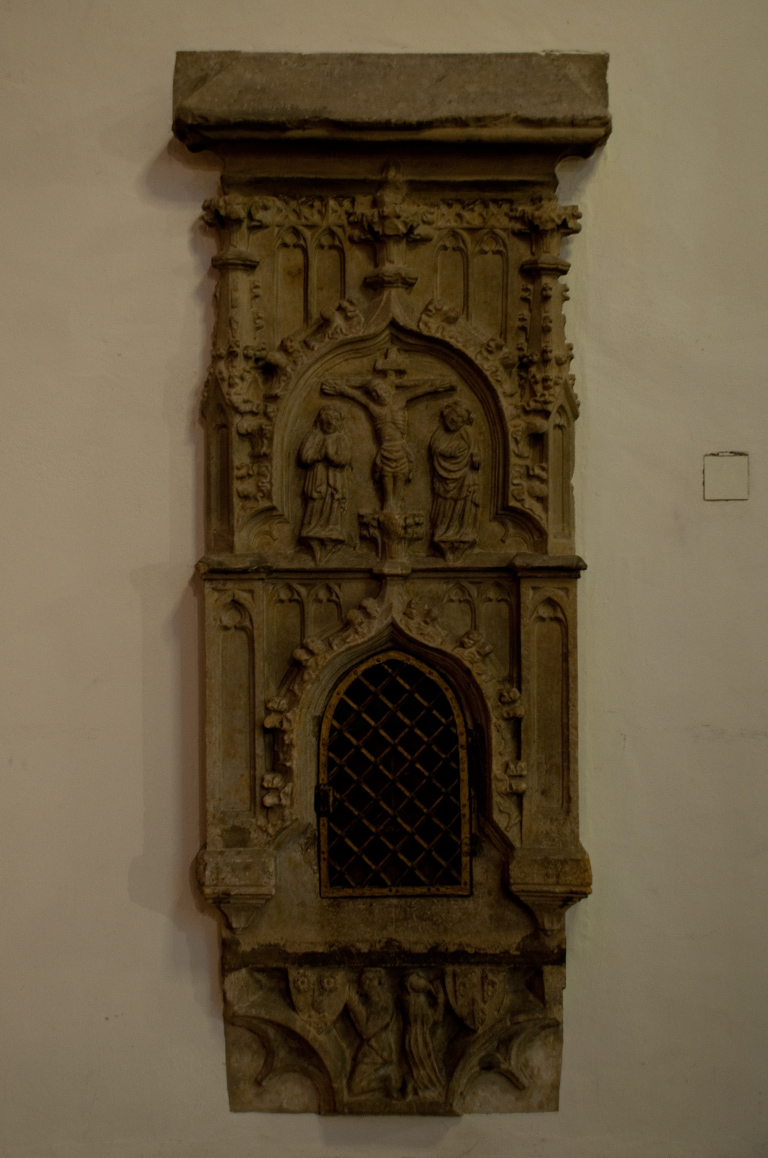
The sacrament house from 1440

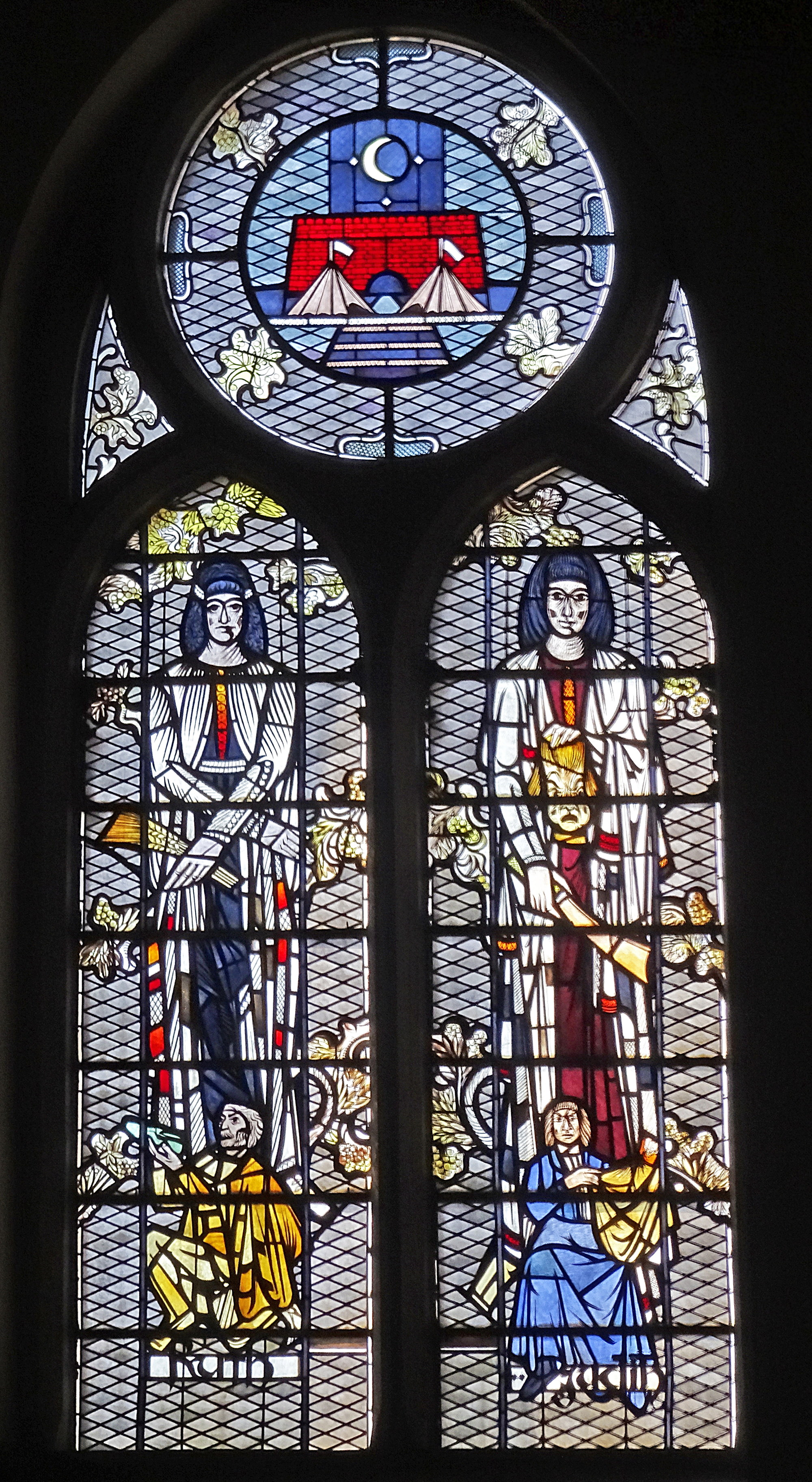
Ruth and Judith

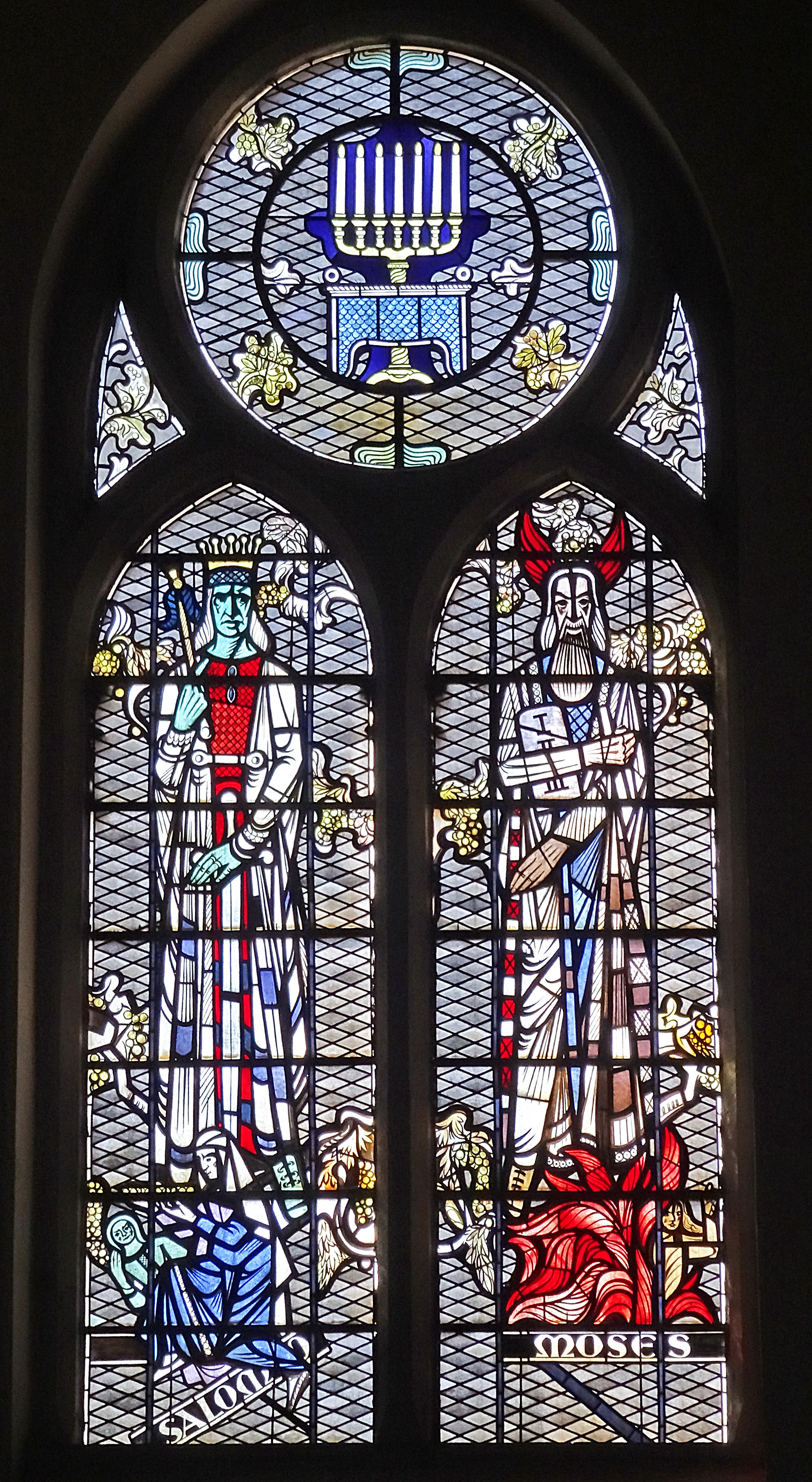
Solomon and Moses

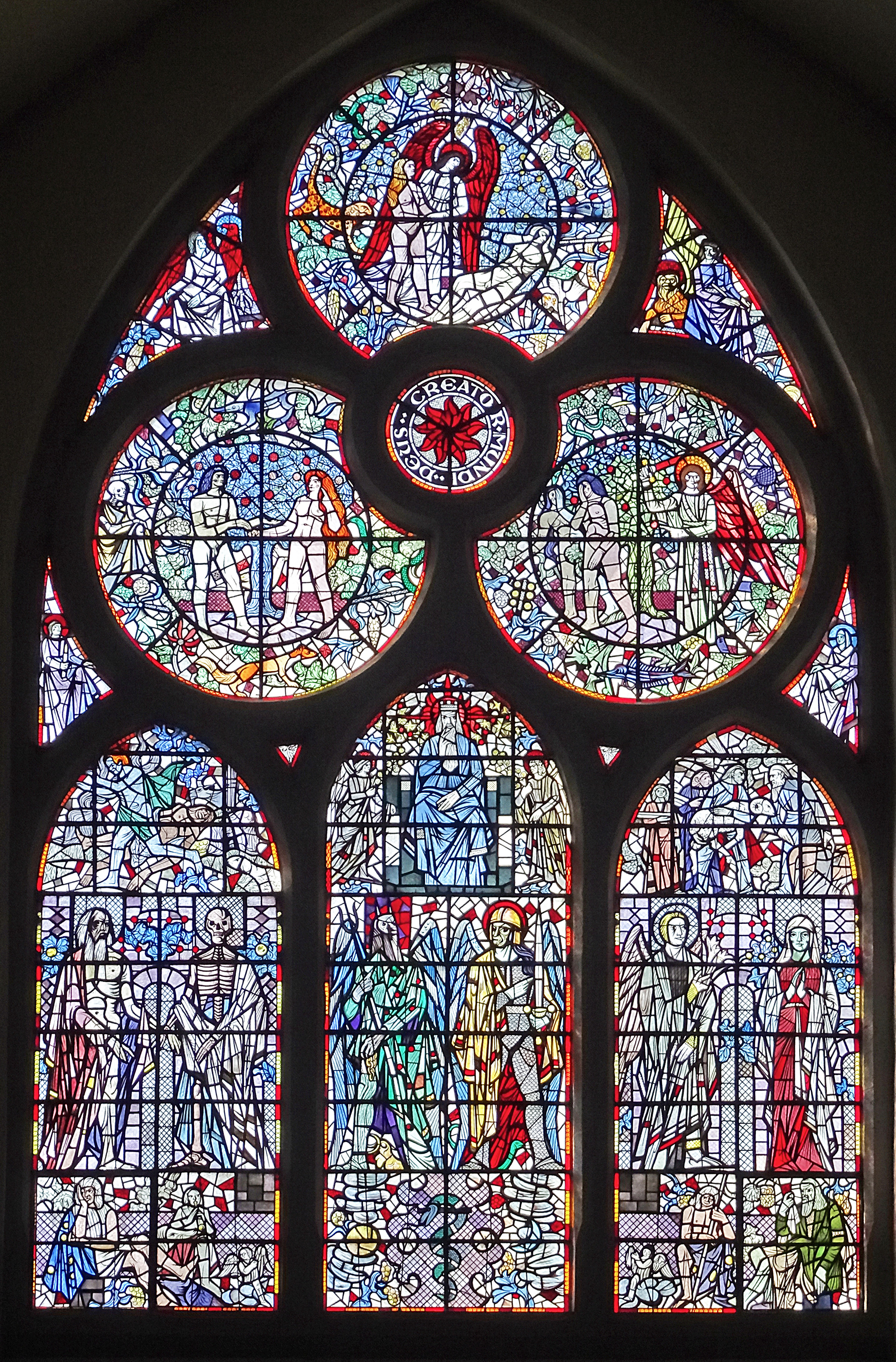
Large west window

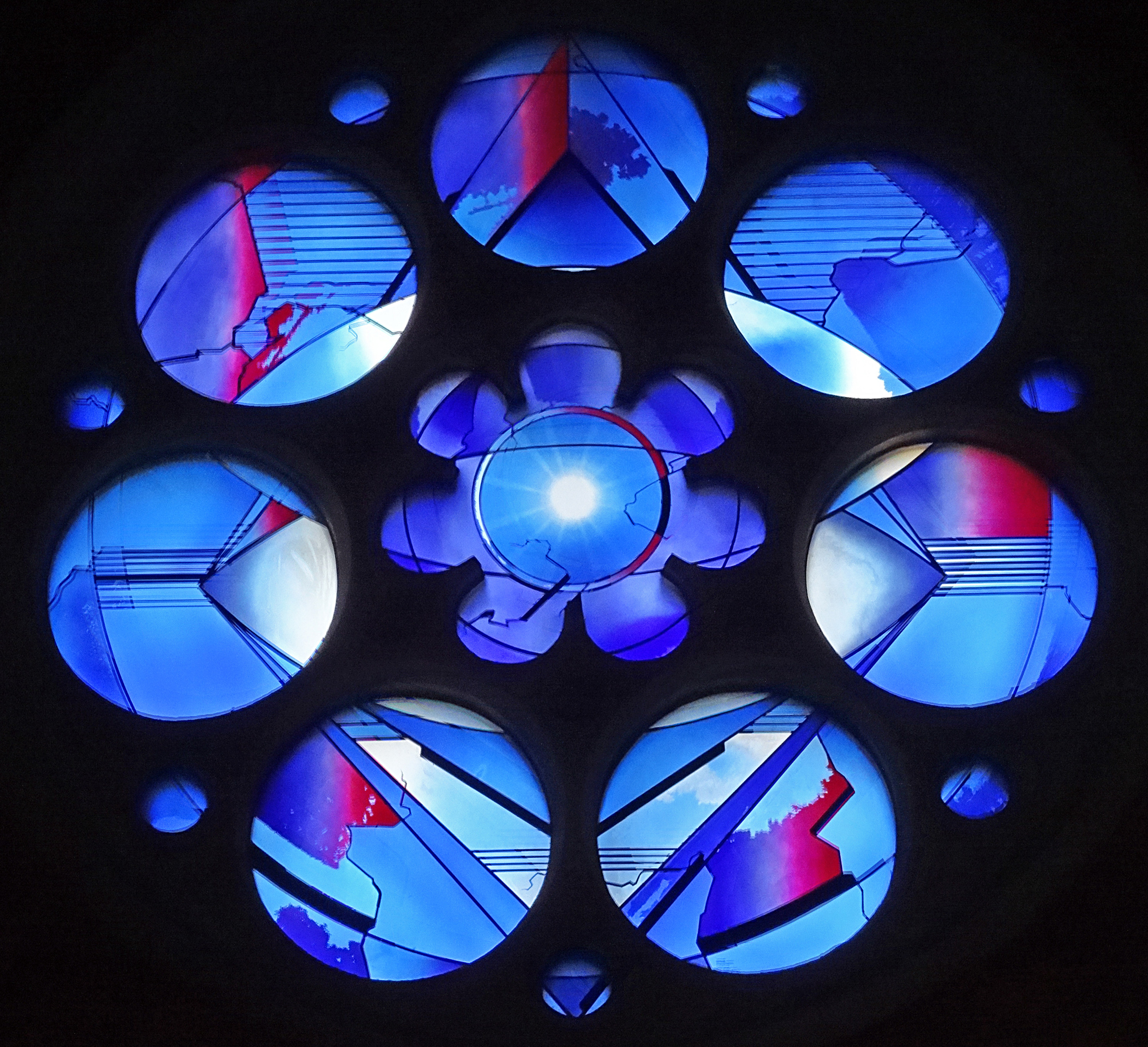
Rose window above the altar

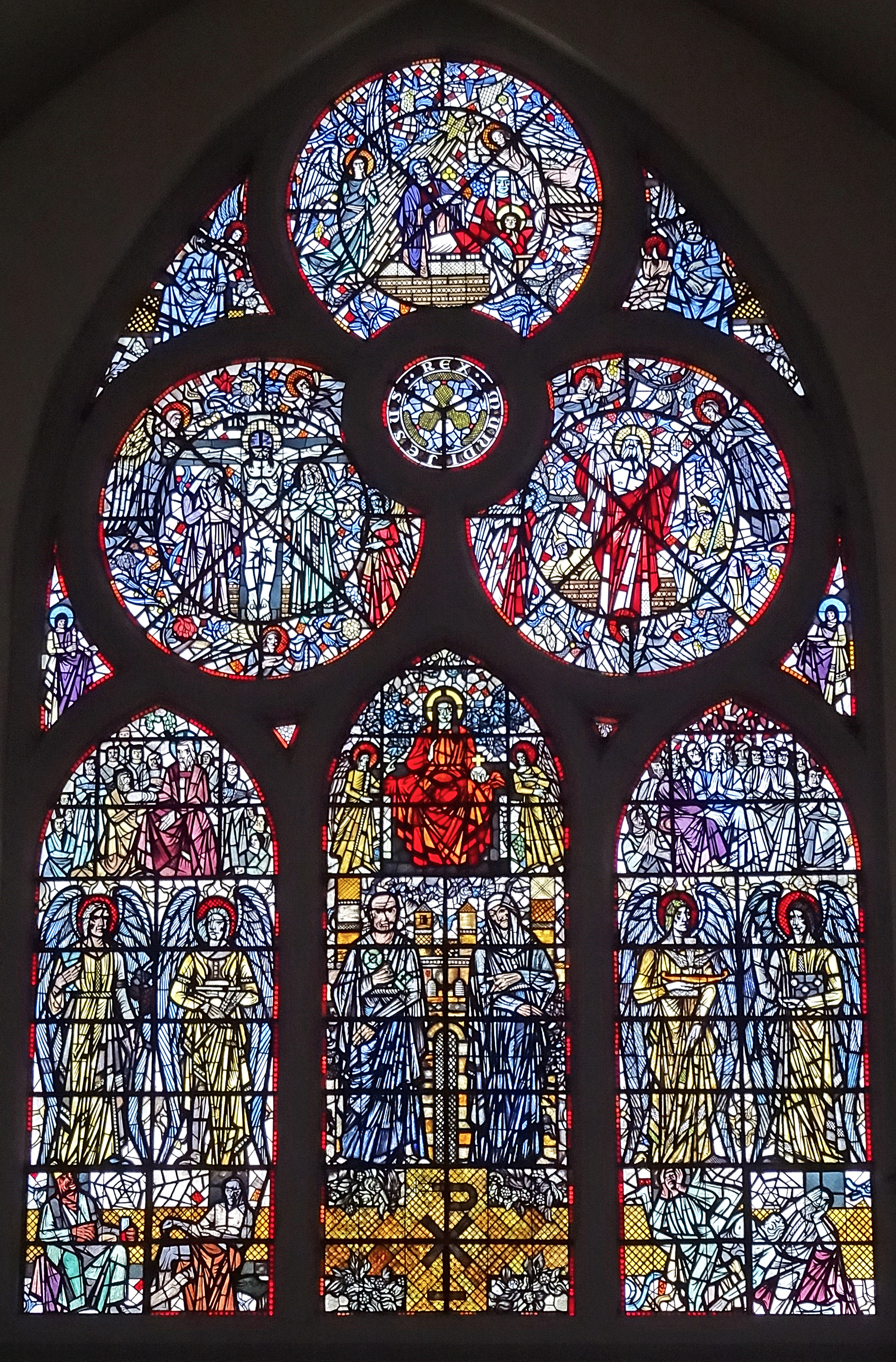
Large east window

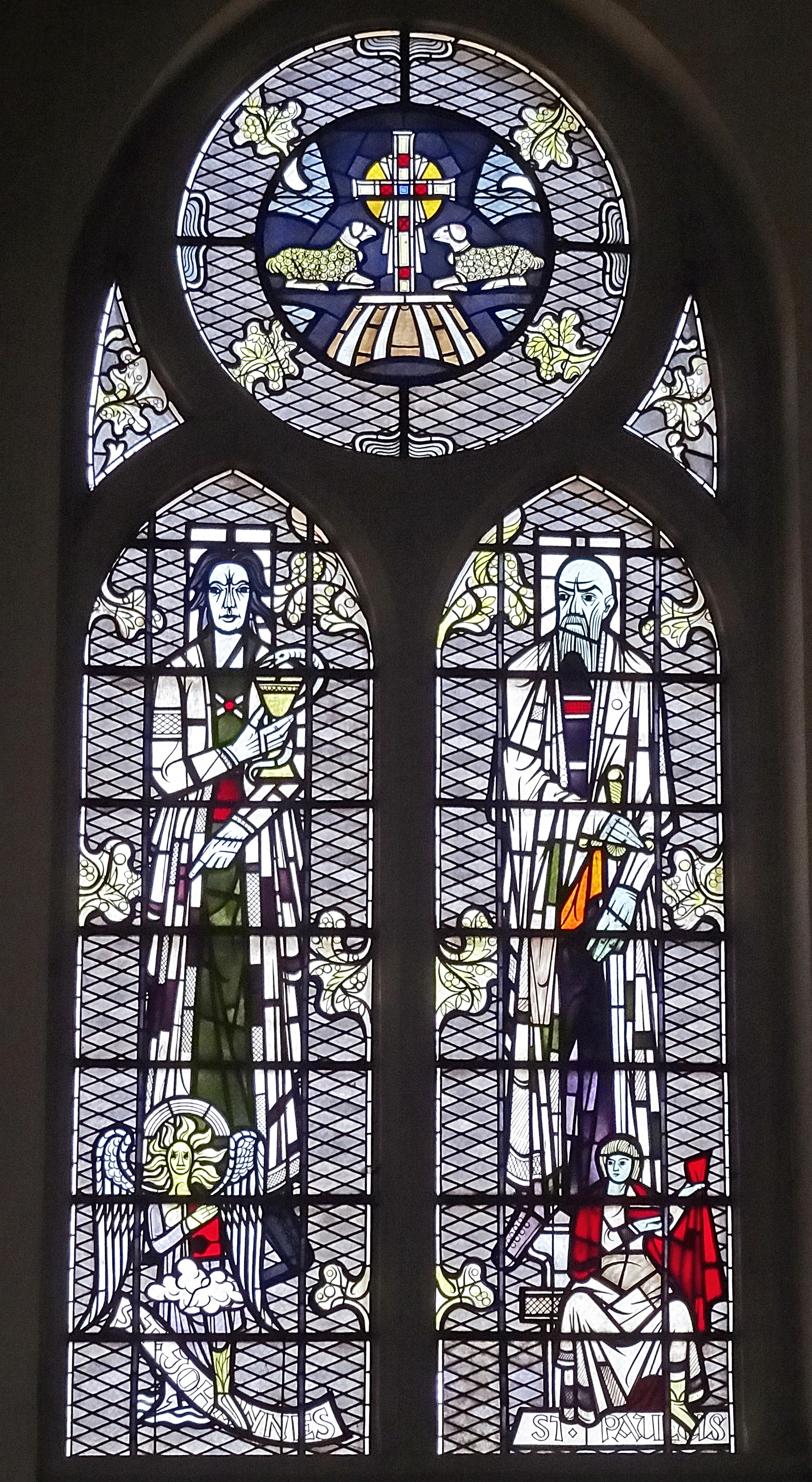
St John and St Paul

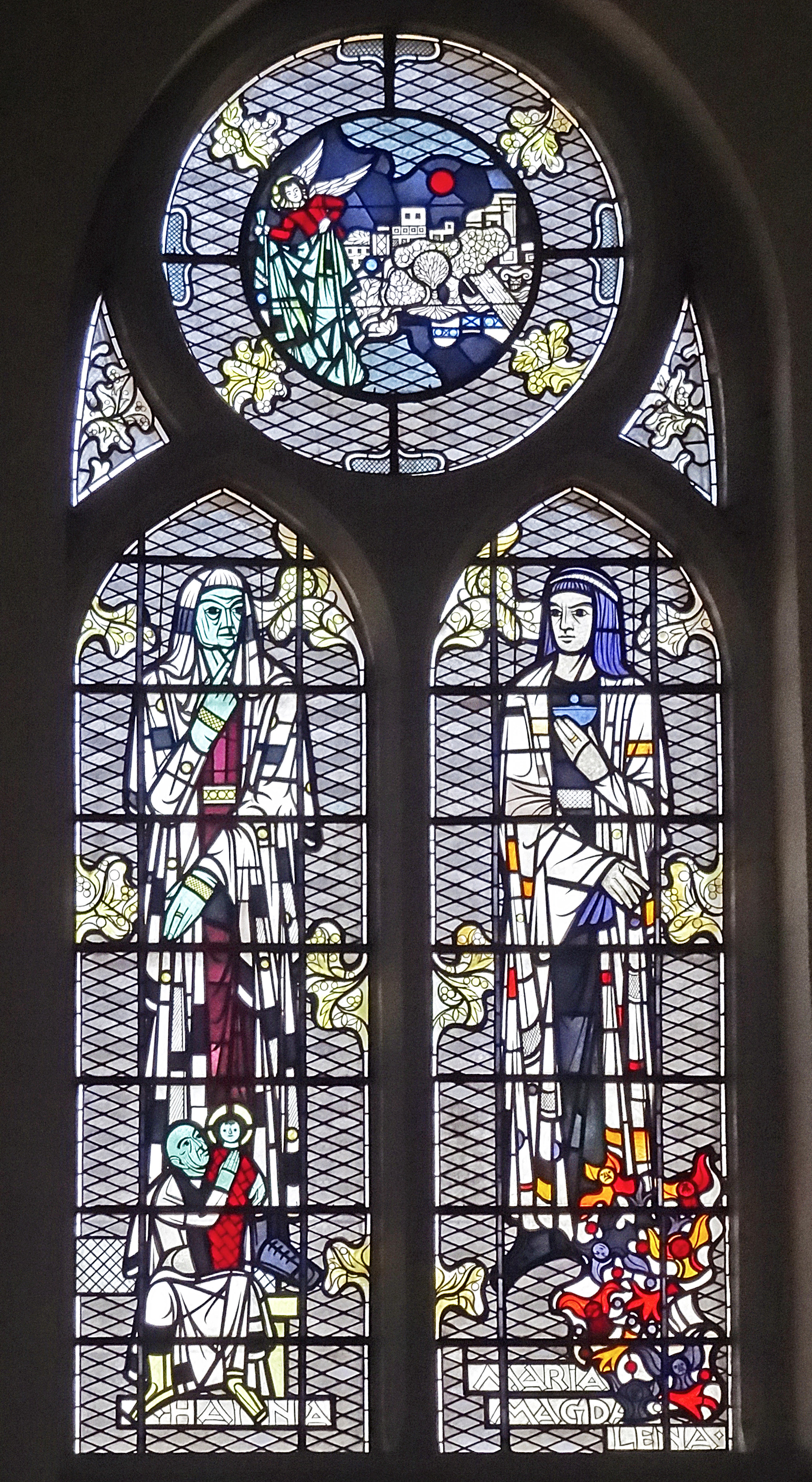
Anna and Mary Magdalene

== Organ ==
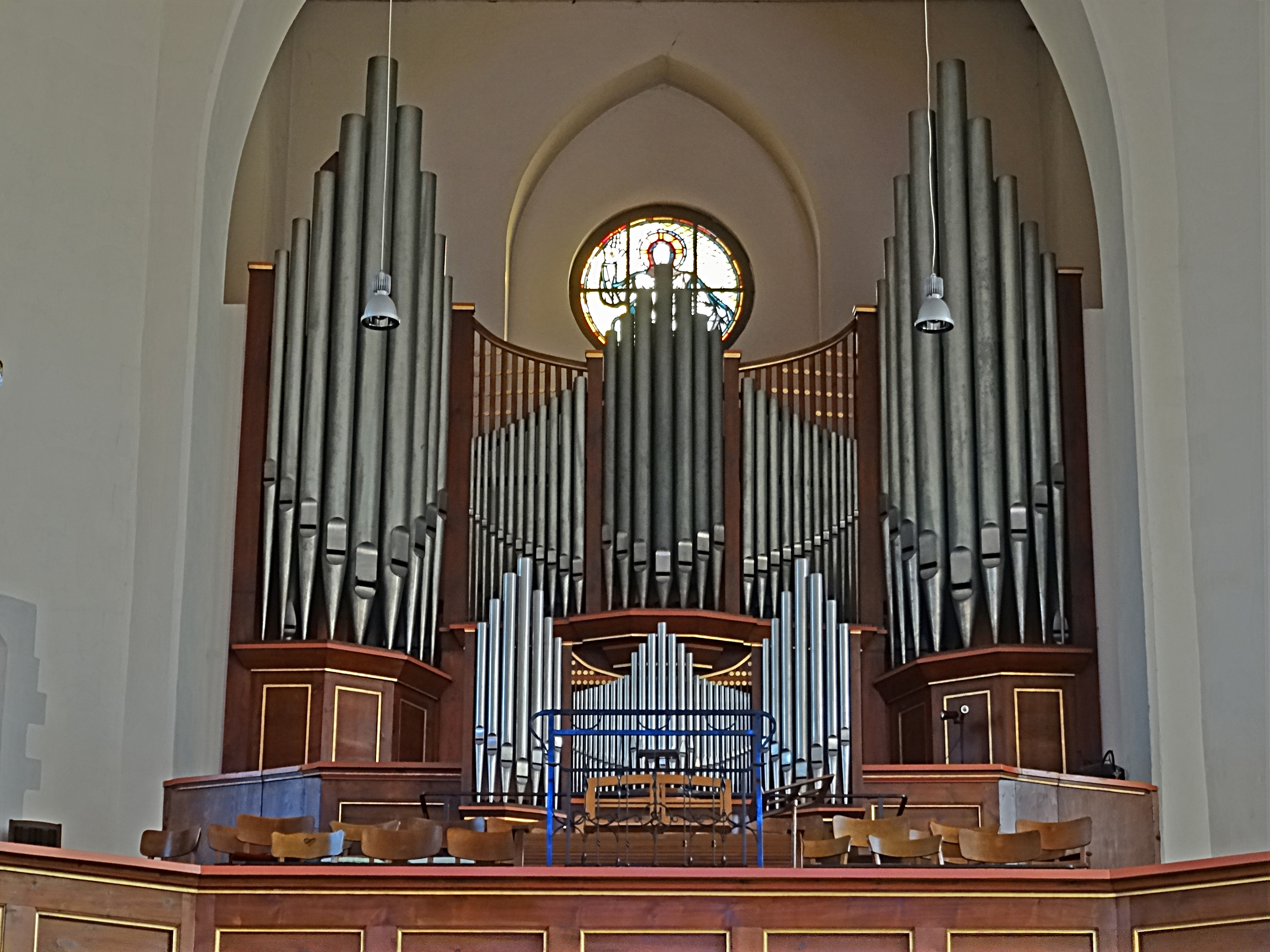
The Schuke organ

Before the Second World War, St Thomas' Church had a large organ built by the Eberhard Friedrich Walcker organ-building workshop in Ludwigsburg with 74 sounding stops on four manuals and pedal, which was, however, destroyed by a bombing raid on Holy Saturday 1945. The present instrument was built by Schuke from Potsdam in 1950, 1953 and 1993 and has 57 stops on three manuals and pedal, with 4,050 pipes in total. The organ's key actions are mechanical, the stop actions are pneumatic. Its stop list is as follows:

I Back positive C–g^{3}
1.	Holzgedackt	8′
2.	Quintadent	8′
3.	Pommer	8′
4.	Prästant	4′
5.	Blockflöte	4′
6.	Spitzflöte	4′
7.	Engprinzipal	2′
8.	Waldflöte	2′
9.	Nasat	1 1/3′
10.	Sesquialter II	2 2/3′
11.	Mixtur IV
12.	Cimbel III
13.	Krummhorn	8′
14.	Trompete	4′
	Tremulant

II Main division C–g^{3}
15.	Quintadena	16′
16.	Prinzipal	8′
17.	Rohrflöte	8′
18.	Gemshorn	8′
19.	Oktave	4′
20.	Nachthorn	4′
21.	Quinte	2 2/3′
22.	Oktave	2′
23.	Flachflöte	2′
24.	Mixtur VI
25.	Scharff IV
26.	Trompete	16′
27.	Trompete	8′

III Upper division C–g^{3}
28.	Lieblich Gedackt	16′
29.	Prinzipal	8′
30.	Dolcan	8′
31.	Stillgedackt	8′
32.	Unda maris	8′
33.	Oktave	4′
34.	Rohrflöte	4′
35.	Nasat	2 2/3′
36.	Blockflöte	2′
37.	Terz	1 3/5′
38.	Hohlqinte	1 1/3′
39.	Septime	1 1/7′
40.	Sifflöte	1′
41.	None	8/9′
42.	Mixtur III–V
43.	Dulcian	16′
44.	Schalmey	8′
	Tremulant

Pedal C–f^{1}
45.	Prinzipal	16′
46.	Subbaß	16′
47.	Großsesquialter II	(ac. 32′)
48.	Oktave	8′
49.	Gedackt	8′
50.	Pommer	4′
51.	Hohlflöte	2′
52.	Baßaliquote IV
53.	Rauschwerk III
54.	Mixtur IV
55.	Posaune	16′
56.	Trompete	8′
57.	Clairon	4′

- Couplers: I/II, III/II, I/P, II/P, III/P

== Bibliography ==
- Mai, Otto-Arend (1983). Die evangelischen Kirchen in Erfurt (in German) (2nd ed.). Berlin: Evangelische Verlagsanstalt.
- Freiherr von Tettau, Wilhelm (1890). Beschreibende Darstellung der älteren Bau- und Kunstdenkmäler der Stadt Erfurt und des Erfurter Landkreises (in German). Halle an der Saale: Otto Hendel Verlag.
- Evangelische Thomaskirche. Festschrift zur Wiedereinweihung am 24.09.2000 nach Renovierung und Umgestaltung des Innenraums (in German). Erfurt: Ev. Thomasgemeinde Erfurt. 2000.
- Verein für Pfarrerinnen und Pfarrer in der Ev. Kirche der Kirchenprovinz Sachsen, ed. (2009). Pfarrerbuch der Kirchenprovinz Sachsen (in German). Vol. 10. Evangelische Verlagsanstalt.
- Wolf, Helmut (2013). Erfurt im Luftkrieg 1939–1945. Schriften des Vereins für die Geschichte und Altertumskunde von Erfurt (in German). Zella-Mehlis/Meiningen: Heinrich-Jung-Verlagsgesellschaft.
