= Trinity Church, Worms =

Coordinates: 49°37′48″N 8°21′42″E

The Holy Trinity Church (German: Dreifaltigkeitskirche), full name Reformation Memorial Church of the Holy Trinity (German: Reformations-Gedächtniskirche zur Heiligen Dreifaltigkeit) is the largest Protestant church in Worms. The baroque hall building is centrally located on the market square of the city and is now under conservation.

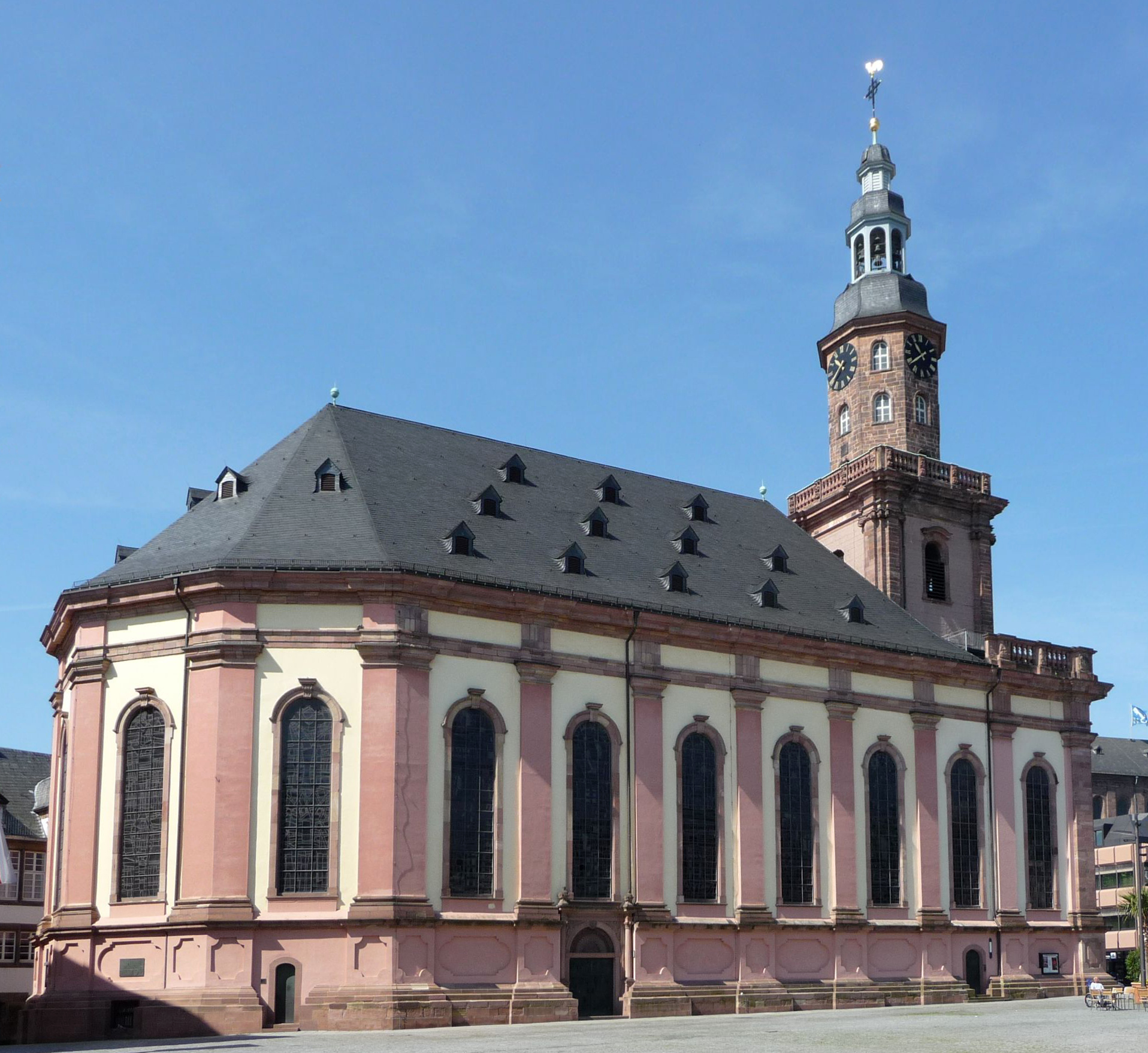
