= Luigi Steffani =

Italian painter (1828–1898)

Luigi Steffani (1828–1898) was an Italian painter, mainly of sea and landscapes.

== Biography ==
Steffani was born in Bergamo. He studied at the Accademia Carrara and was a resident of Bergamo. He had moved there to study in 1844.

In 1854, he traveled to France, Belgium, and Germany, then moved on to Sicily, to Naples, and finally to Rome for a long spell.

In 1858, he returned to Paris for two years, then traveled to London for six years, returning to Italy to reside in Milan.

In 1872, he was made knight of the Order of the Crown of Italy and an official in 1881; for 15 years, he was a professor at the Brera Academy.

== Works exhibited ==
- At the 1870 Mostra Italiana of Fine Arts of Parma: La Marina, The Old Port of Ostend, and Pasture on the Road
- At the Exhibition of Fine Arts in Milan: Returning from Fishing, The Quarry, Marca bassa, La marina, A London Street, and Normal Fishermen
- In 1880 in Turin: Venice at Ponte del Viu, Marea crescente, and Marea bassa (mare del nord)
- In 1881 at the Exhibition of Fine Arts in Milan: Riviera ligure, Marina, Effect of Rain, Riva degli Schiavoni, Smarrita, Fog, Lagoon, and Marina
- In 1883 at the Exposition of Fine Arts in Milan: Giovenche, Querela, and Nella brughiera
- In 1883 in Rome: A Foggy Day in Milan, Near Pompei, Impression from Life
- At the 1884 Exposition of Turin: Da Chioggia a Sottomarina, Un mattino sulla brighiera, Smarrita, and Walking Home
- In 1886, in Milan: Spring Flowers, Banchi d'ostriche, Un colpo di vento, Dal pascolo, Autumn Leaves, and Sulla Laguna
- In 1886, at the first Exhibition of Fine Arts in Livorno: Un colpo di vento
- At the 1887 National Artistic Exposition of Venice: Dal paseo, Prime nebbie, Dalla pesca, and Of the Mountains
- At the 1888 Mostra of Fine Arts in Bologna: First Fog
