= Martin Stephani =

Martin Stephani (born November 2, 1915, in Eisleben; died June 9, 1983, was a German conductor and professor. He served as a music consultant ("Musikreferent") in the SS "Führungshauptamt", conductor of the Waffen-SS Symphony Orchestra, and, after World War II, director of the Northwest German Academy of Music (Nordwestdeutsche Musikakademie) in Detmold.

== Life ==
Stephani was born to the organist and municipal music director Hermann Stephani (1877–1960) and his wife Elisabeth (Hilde Lisa), née Kunze (1889–1969), in Eisleben, and grew up in Marburg, where his father worked as a university music director and lecturer in musicology starting in 1921. From 1937 to 1940, Stephani studied at the Berlin University of the Arts with Walther Gmeindl, Fritz Stein, and Kurt Thomas and became a "Kameradschaftsführer" in the National Socialist Student Union there. In 1941, Stephani was initially assigned to the Leibstandarte SS Adolf Hitler before being transferred at his own request to the Waffen-SS "Führungshauptamt". In 1942, he attained the rank of Untersturmführer, and in 1943, the rank of Obersturmführer. Stephani was involved in establishing the Waffen-SS's own musical organization, including a symphony orchestra, and probably played a significant role in the 1942 decree concerning "works by 1. Jewish, 2. undesirable, and 3. suitable composers for the Waffen-SS.” When he married the singer Hanne-Lies Küpper on December 28, 1944, a ceremony conceived by Stephani himself according to SS rites took place. From 1945 to 1947, he was interned in various British camps. In the denazification process, he was initially fined, but in 1948 classified in Category V ("uncompromised"). In 1948, he founded a Studio for New Music ("Marburger Kantorei") in Marburg. His application for the position of municipal music director in Bielefeld in 1949 failed due to his SS past. From 1951 to 1963, he worked as conductor of the Wuppertal Concert Society and, from 1955, simultaneously as leader of the Bergisches Landeskonservatorium. In 1957, he was appointed lecturer in conducting at the Northwest German Academy of Music (now the Detmold University of Music) and also took over leadership of the Frankfurt Cäcilien Verein. In 1959, he became the general music director of Wuppertal (predecessor: Hans Weisbach), and in the same year succeeded Wilhelm Maler as director of the Detmold Academy of Music. He remained in this position until 1982. One of his students was the organist and professor Martin Lücker. During his tenure, he introduced a cooperation with the university ("Gesamthochschule") of Paderborn, establishing a program in musicology in Detmold. He also served as the musical director of the Bielefeld Music Society and made significant contributions to the North Rhine-Westphalian Youth Orchestra (Landesjugendorchester Nordrheinwestfalen). In 1968, a proposal by the minister of culture of North Rhine-Westphalia to award Stephani the Order of Merit of the Federal Republic of Germany was rejected due to his former position in the SS. In 1980 however, he did receive the Culture Prize of the city of Bielefeld. Eventually, Martin Stephani died (in Detmold?) on June 9, 1983. In 1987, a double LP titled "Hommage für Martin Stephani" was released. From 2015 to 2018, on the initiative of the Detmold University of Music, Stephani's activities during National Socialism and in the post-war period were historically reviewed.

== Discography ==
- 1976: Anton Bruckner Te Deum and Giuseppe Verdi Te Deum (with the Philharmonia Hungarica and the Choir of the Musikverein Bielefeld) – Teldec resp. Apex
- 1978: Paul Hindemith – Voorspiel zu einem Requiem (with the Landesjugendorchester Nordrhein-Westfalen, Da Camera)
- 1978: Franz Liszt – Orpheus (with the Landesjugendorchester Nordrhein-Westfalen, Da Camera)
- 1982: Johann Sebastian Bach – Five Sinfonias (with the Deutsche Bachsolisten, Bärenreiter-Verlag)
- 1982: Georg Friedrich Händel – Music for the Royal Fireworks (with the Deutsche Bachsolisten, Bärenreiter-Verlag)
- 1983: Max Reger – An die Hoffnung. Eine romantische Suite (with the Landesjugendorchester Nordrhein-Westfalen, Da Camera)
- 2008: Hugo Distler – Concerto for Harpsichord and Strings (with the Deutsche Bachsolisten, archived recording, Klassik-Center Kassel)
- 1969: Georg Friedrich Händel – Saul – Die Instrumentalsätze (with the Deutsche Bachsolisten, Bärenreiter-Verlag)
- 1969: Georg Friedrich Händel – Passionskantate nach dem Evangelisten Johannes (with the Choir of the Bielefelder Musikverein and the Kölner Kammerorchester, Schwann Verlag)
- 1990: Ludwig van Beethoven – Symphony Nr. 9 (with the Musikverein Bielefeld, recordings of 1960 und 1976, Teldec)
