= Augustin Pyramus de Candolle =

Swiss botanist (1778–1841)

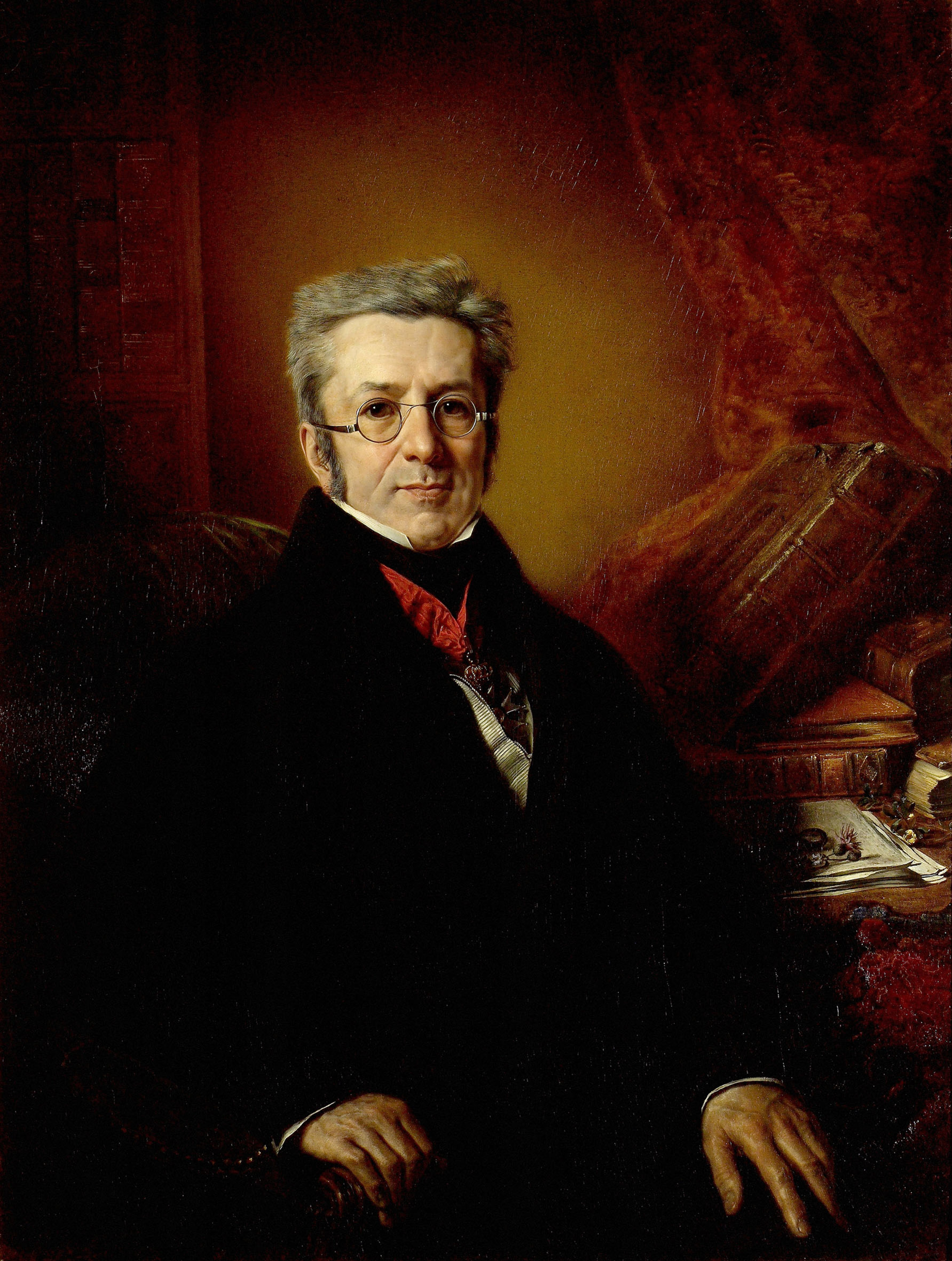
- Portrait by Joseph Hornung, 1839
- Born: 4 February 1778; Geneva, Republic of Geneva
- Died: 9 September 1841 (aged 63); Geneva, Switzerland
- Other name: Augustin Pyrame de Candolle
- Education: Collège de Genève
- Known for: System of Taxonomy, Principle of "Nature's War"
- Relatives: Alphonse Pyramus de Candolle (son); Casimir de Candolle (grandson); Richard Émile Augustin de Candolle (great-grandson)
- Awards: Royal Medal (1833)
- Scientific career
- Fields: Botany, agronomy, phytogeography, chronobiology
- Workplaces: University of Montpellier, Collège de Genève
- Patrons: Georges Cuvier
- Author abbrev. (botany): DC.

Augustin Pyramus (or Pyrame) de Candolle (UK: /kænˈdɒl/, US: /kɒ̃ˈdɔːl/, French: [kɑ̃dɔl]; 4 February 1778 – 9 September 1841) was a Swiss botanist. René Louiche Desfontaines launched de Candolle's botanical career by recommending him at a herbarium. Within a couple of years de Candolle had established a new genus, and he went on to document hundreds of plant families and create a new natural plant classification system. Although de Candolle's main focus was botany, he also contributed to related fields such as phytogeography, agronomy, paleontology, medical botany, and economic botany.

De Candolle originated the idea of "Nature's war", which influenced Charles Darwin and the principle of natural selection. De Candolle recognized that multiple species may develop similar characteristics that did not appear in a common evolutionary ancestor; a phenomenon now known as convergent evolution. During his work with plants, de Candolle noticed that plant leaf movements follow a near-24-hour cycle in constant light, suggesting that an internal biological clock exists. Though many scientists doubted de Candolle's findings, experiments over a century later demonstrated that "the internal biological clock" indeed exists.

De Candolle's descendants continued his work on plant classification; son Alphonse and grandson Casimir de Candolle contributed to the Prodromus Systematis Naturalis Regni Vegetabilis, a catalog of plants begun by Augustin Pyramus de Candolle.

== Early life ==
Augustin Pyramus de Candolle was born on 4 February 1778 in Geneva, Republic of Geneva, to Augustin de Candolle, a former official, and his wife, Louise Eléonore Brière. His family descended from one of the ancient families of Provence in France, but relocated to Geneva at the end of the 16th century to escape religious persecution.

At age seven de Candolle contracted a severe case of hydrocephalus, which significantly affected his childhood. Nevertheless, he is said to have had great aptitude for learning, distinguishing himself in school with his rapid acquisition of knowledge in classical and general literature and his ability to write fine poetry. In 1794, he began his scientific studies at the Collège de Genève, where he studied under Jean Pierre Étienne Vaucher, who later inspired de Candolle to make botanical science the chief pursuit of his life.

== Career in botany ==
He spent four years at the Geneva Academy, studying science and law according to his father's wishes. In 1798, he moved to Paris after Geneva had been annexed to the French Republic. His botanical career formally began with the help of René Louiche Desfontaines, who recommended de Candolle for work in the herbarium of Charles Louis L'Héritier de Brutelle during the summer of 1798. The position elevated de Candolle's reputation and also led to valuable instruction from Desfontaines himself. de Candolle established his first genus, Senebiera, in 1799.

De Candolle's first books, Plantarum historia succulentarum (4 vols., 1799) and Astragalogia (1802), brought him to the notice of Georges Cuvier and Jean-Baptiste Lamarck. de Candolle, with Cuvier's approval, acted as deputy at the Collège de France in 1802. Lamarck entrusted him with the publication of the third edition of the Flore française (1805–1815), (Note: The Flore française (third edition) was published in 1805 in 5 volumes, and reissued in 1815 together with a sixth volume as a supplement) and in the introduction entitled Principes élémentaires de botanique, de Candolle proposed a natural method of plant classification as opposed to the artificial Linnaean method. The premise of de Candolle's method is that taxa do not fall along a linear scale; they are discrete, not continuous. Lamarck had originally published this work in 1778, with a second edition in 1795. The third edition, which bears the name of both Lamarck and de Candolle, was in reality the work of the latter, the former having only lent his name and access to his collection.

In 1804, de Candolle published his Essai sur les propriétés médicales des plantes and was granted a doctor of medicine degree by the medical faculty of Paris. Two years later, he published Synopsis plantarum in flora Gallica descriptarum. de Candolle then spent the next six summers making a botanical and agricultural survey of France at the request of the French government, which was published in 1813. In 1807, he was appointed professor of botany in the medical faculty of the University of Montpellier, where he would later become the first chair of botany in 1810. His teaching at the University of Montpellier consisted of field classes attended by 200–300 students, starting at 5:00 am and finishing at 7:00 pm.

During this period, de Candolle became a close acquaintance of the Portuguese polymath, José Correia da Serra, who was Portuguese ambassador to Paris and who circulated in an international network of thinkers ranging from the Briton Joseph Banks to the Americans Thomas Jefferson and William Bartram, and the French scholars Antoine Laurent de Jussieu and Georges Cuvier. Correia's endorsement of the idea of emphasizing similarity and symmetry in classifying plants influenced de Candolle, who acknowledged as much in his writing.

While in Montpellier, de Candolle published his Théorie élémentaire de la botanique (Elementary Theory of Botany, 1813), which introduced a new classification system and the word taxonomy. Candolle moved back to Geneva in 1816 and in the following year was invited by the government of the Canton of Geneva to fill the newly created chair of natural history.

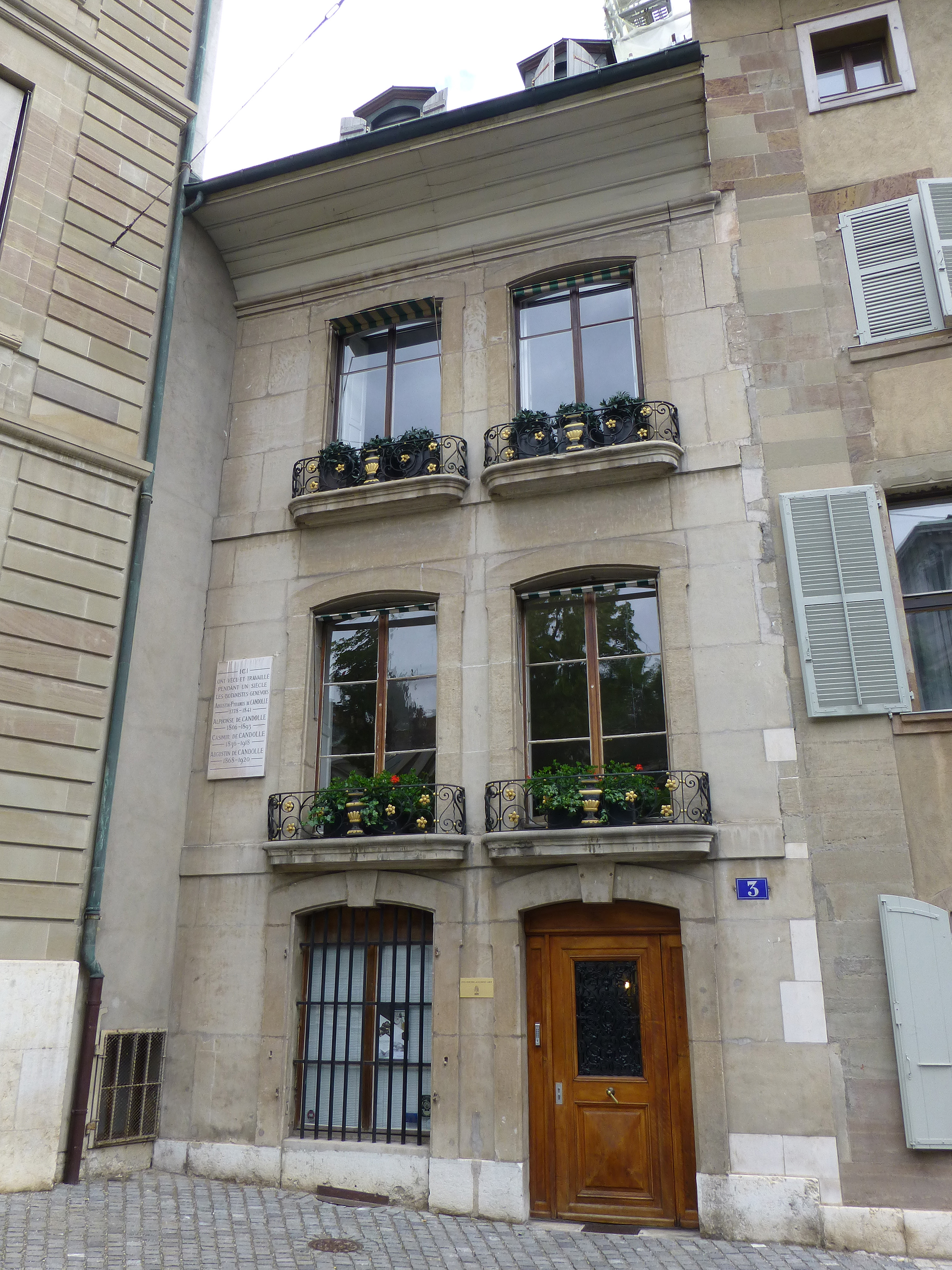
de Candolle family home in Geneva

De Candolle spent the rest of his life in an attempt to elaborate and complete his natural system of botanical classification. de Candolle published initial work in his Regni vegetabillis systema naturale, but after two volumes he realized he could not complete the project on such a large scale. Consequently, he began his less extensive Prodromus Systematis Naturalis Regni Vegetabilis in 1824. However, he was able to finish only seven volumes, or two-thirds of the whole. Even so, he was able to characterize over one hundred families of plants, helping to lay the empirical basis of general botany. Although de Candolle's main focus was botany, throughout his career he also dabbled in fields related to botany, such as phytogeography, agronomy, paleontology, medical botany, and economic botany.

In 1827, he was elected an associated member of the Royal Institute of the Netherlands.

== Later life ==
Augustin de Candolle was the first of four generations of botanists in the de Candolle dynasty. He married Mademoiselle Torras and their son, Alphonse Pyramus de Candolle, eventually succeeded to his father's chair in botany and continued the Prodromus. Casimir de Candolle, Augustin de Candolle's grandson, also contributed to the Prodromus through his detailed, extensive research and characterization of the plant family Piperaceae. Augustin de Candolle's great-grandson, Richard Émile Augustin de Candolle, was also a botanist. Augustin de Candolle died on 9 September 1841 in Geneva, after being sick for many years. That same year, he was elected as a member of the American Philosophical Society.

In 2017, a book was written in French about his life and one of his greatest contributions, the Botanical Garden of Geneva.

== Legacy ==
He is remembered in the plant genera Candollea and Candolleodendron, several plant species like Eugenia candolleana or Diospyros candolleana and the mushroom Psathyrella candolleana. Candollea, a scientific journal that publishes papers on systematic botany and phylotaxonomy, was named after de Candolle and his descendants in honor of their contribution to the field of botany. He was a mentor to the French-Mexican botanist Jean-Louis Berlandier and is credited with encouraging Marie-Anne Libert to investigate cryptogamic flora.

A bust of de Candolle stands in Zurich's Old Botanical Garden.

=== Classification system ===
De Candolle was the first to put forward the idea of "Nature's war", writing of plants being "at war one with another" with the meaning of different species fighting each other for space and resources. Charles Darwin studied de Candolle's "natural system" of classification in 1826 when at the University of Edinburgh, and in the inception of Darwin's theory in 1838 he considered "the warring of the species", adding that it was even more strongly conveyed by Thomas Malthus, producing the pressures that Darwin later called natural selection. In 1839, de Candolle visited Britain and Darwin invited him to dinner, allowing the two scientists the opportunity to discuss the idea.

De Candolle was also among the first to recognize the difference between the morphological and physiological characteristics of organs. He ascribed plant morphology as being related to the number of organs and their positions relative to each other rather than to their various physiological properties. Consequently, this made him the first to attempt to attribute specific reasons for structural and numerical relationships amongst organs, and thus to distinguish between major and minor aspects of plant symmetry. To account for modifications of symmetry in parts of different plants, an occurrence that could hinder the discovery of an evolutionary relationship, de Candolle introduced the concept of homology.

=== Chronobiology ===
De Candolle also made contributions to the field of chronobiology. Building upon earlier work on plant circadian leaf movements contributed by such scientists as Jean-Jacques d'Ortous de Mairan and Henri-Louis Duhamel du Monceau. De Candolle observed in 1832 that the plant Mimosa pudica had a free-running period of leaf opening and closing of approximately 22–23 hours in constant light, significantly less than the approximate 24-hour period of the Earth's light-dark cycles. Since the period was shorter than 24 hours, he hypothesized that a different clock had to be responsible for the rhythm; the shortened period was not entrained—coordinated—by environmental cues, thus the clock appeared to be endogenous. Despite these findings, a number of scientists continued to search for "factor X", an unknown exogenous factor associated with the Earth's rotation that was driving circadian oscillations in the absence of a light dark schedule, until the mid-twentieth century. In the mid-1920s, Erwin Bunning repeated Candolle's findings and came to similar conclusions, and studies that showed the persistence of circadian rhythm in the South Pole and in a space lab further confirmed the existence of oscillations in the absence of environmental cues.

== Published works ==
- Reticularia rosea (1798)
- Historia Plantarum Succulentarum (4 vols., 1799) Archived 2 September 2006 at the Wayback Machine
- Astragalogia (1802)
- de Lamarck, Jean-Baptiste; de Candolle, AP (1815) [1805]. Flore française ou descriptions succinctes de toutes les plantes qui croissent naturellement en France disposées selon une nouvelle méthode d'analyse; et précédées par un exposé des principes élémentaires de la botanique (in French) (3rd ed.). Paris: Desray.
  - Introduction: Principes élémentaires de botanique p. 61
    - also published separately as: –
    - de Lamarck, Jean-Baptiste; de Candolle, Augustin Pyramus (1805). Principes élémentaires de botanique et de physique végétale (extract) (3rd ed.). Paris: Desray.
  - vol. I
  - vol. II
  - vol. III
  - vol. IV Part I
- Lamarck, Jean Baptiste Pierre Antoine de Monet de; Candolle, Augustin Pyramus de (1815). FLORE FRANÇAISE, OU, Descriptions succinctes de toutes les plantes qui croissent naturellement en France : disposées selon une nouvelle méthode d'analyse, et précédées par un exposé des principes élémentaires de la botanique [SHORT DESCRIPTIONS OF ALL PLANTS WHICH ARE NATURALLY GROWING IN FRANCE, ARRANGED ACCORDING TO A NEW METHOD OF ANALYSIS, And preceded by a Statement of Elementary Principles of Botany] (in French). Vol. 1. Desray.
  - vol. V Supplementary volume, volume index page 650
- Les liliacées vols. 1–4, (1805–1808) Archived 19 May 2011 at the Wayback Machine of 8
- Essai sur les propriétés médicales des plantes comparées avec leurs formes extérieures et leur classification naturelle (1804)
- Synopsis plantarum in flora Gallica descriptarum (1806)
- Mémoire sur la Géographie des Plantes de France, Considerée dans Ses Rapports avec la Hauteur Absolue (1817)
- de Candolle, AP (1819) [1813]. Théorie élémentaire de la botanique, ou exposition des principes de la classification naturelle et de l'art de décrire et d'etudier les végétaux (2nd ed.). Déterville. (2nd ed. 1819)
- Flore du Mexique (1819) transcribed in Hervé M. Burdet, "Le récit par Augustin Pyramus de Candolle de l'élaboration de la Flore du Mexique, dite aussi Flore des dames de Genève," Anales del Jardín Botánico de Madrid, 54 (1996) 575–88.
- de Candolle, Augustin Pyramus (1818–1821). Regni vegetabilis systema naturale, sive Ordines, genera et species plantarum secundum methodi naturalis normas digestarum et descriptarum 2 vols. Paris: Treuttel et Würtz.
- Essai Élémentaire de Géographie Botanique (1820)
- A. P. de Candolle and K. Sprengel. Elements of the philosophy of plants: containing the principles of scientific botany. W. Blackwood, Edinburgh,1821.
- de Candolle, A. P. (1824–1873). Prodromus systematis naturalis regni vegetabilis, sive, Enumeratio contracta ordinum generum specierumque plantarum huc usque cognitarium, juxta methodi naturalis, normas digesta 17 vols. Paris: Treuttel et Würtz.
  - First seven volumes 1824–1839, continued by Alphonse Pyramus de Candolle

== See also ==
- Category:Taxa named by Augustin Pyramus de Candolle

== Bibliography ==
Books

- Albrecht, Urs (2010). "A History of Chronobiological Concepts". The Circadian Clock. Springer New York. pp. 1–35. doi:10.1007/978-1-4419-1262-6_1. ISBN 978-1-4419-1262-6.
- Allaby, Michael (2010). Plants: Food, Medicine, and the Green Earth. Infobase Publishing. ISBN 978-0-8160-6102-0.
- Buek, H.W. (1840–1874). Genera, species et synonyma Candolleana: alphabetico ordine disposita, seu Index generalis et specialis ad A.P. Decandolle, Prodromum systematis naturalis regni vegetabilis. Berlin: Sumptibus librariae Nauckianae.
- Desmond, Adrian; Moore, James (1991). Darwin. London: Michael Joseph, Penguin Group. ISBN 978-0-7181-3430-3.
- Gray, Asa; Sargent, Charles (1889). Scientific papers of Asa Gray: Selected by Charles Sprague Sargent. Houghton Mifflin. p. 292.
- Isely, Duane (2002). One Hundred and One Botanists. Purdue University Press. ISBN 978-1-55753-283-1.
- Sachs, Julius; Balfour, Isaac Bayley; Garsney, Henry Edward Fowler (1890). History of Botany (1530–1860). Oxford: Clarendon Press.
- Singh, Gurcharan (2004). Plant systematics: an integrated approach. Science Publishers. ISBN 978-1-57808-351-0.
- Stevens, Peter Francis (1994). The development of biological systematics: Antoine-Laurent de Jussieu, nature, and the natural system. Columbia University Press. ISBN 978-0-231-06440-8.
- Williams, D. M.; Knapp, Sandra, eds. (2010). Beyond Cladistics: The Branching of a Paradigm. University of California Press. ISBN 978-0-520-26772-5.
- RJ Willis. Augustin Pyramus de Candolle, and His Era; in The History of Allelopathy. Springer 2007

Encyclopaedias

- This article incorporates text from a publication now in the public domain: Chisholm, Hugh, ed. (1911). "Candolle, Augustin Pyrame de". Encyclopædia Britannica. Vol. 5 (11th ed.). Cambridge University Press. pp. 180–181.

Articles

- Brewster, David; Taylor, Richard; Phillips, Richard; Kane, Robert (March 1842). "Proceedings of Learned Societies: Royal Society Obituary Notice". Philosophical Magazine and Journal of Science. 20.
- Eckardt, Nancy A. (2005). "Temperature Entrainment of the Arabidopsis Circadian Clock". The Plant Cell. 17 (3): 645–647. Bibcode:2005PlanC..17..645E. doi:10.1105/tpc.104.031336. PMC 1069688.
- Emerson, George B (1842). "A Notice of Prof. Augustine Pyrame de Candolle". The American Journal of Science and Arts. 42: 217–226.
- Martius, Carl Friedrich (July 1843). "Notice of the Life and Labours of DeCandolle". The Annals and Magazine of Natural History: Including Zoology, Botany, and Geology. 12 (74): 1–20.
- McClung, C. Robertson (2006). "Plant Circadian Rhythms". The Plant Cell. 18 (4): 792–794. Bibcode:2006PlanC..18..792M. doi:10.1105/tpc.106.040980. PMC 1425852. PMID 16595397.
- Moore, Robert; Eichler, Victor (July 1972). "Loss of a circadian adrenal corticosterone rhythm following suprachiasmatic lesions in the rat". Brain Research. 42 (1): 201–206. doi:10.1016/0006-8993(72)90054-6. PMID 5047187.
- Moore-Ede, MC. (1986). "Physiology of the circadian timing system: predictive versus reactive homeostasis". American Journal of Physiology. Regulatory, Integrative and Comparative Physiology. 250 (5): R737–R752. doi:10.1152/ajpregu.1986.250.5.r737. PMID 3706563.
- Johnson, Maynard S (1926). "Activity and distribution of certain wild mice in relation to biotic communities". Journal of Mammalogy. 7 (2): 245–277. doi:10.2307/1373575. JSTOR 1373575.
- Stephan, Friedrich K; Zucker, Irving (1972). "Circadian Rhythms in Drinking Behavior and Locomotor Activity of Rats Are Eliminated by Hypothalamic Lesions". Proceedings of the National Academy of Sciences of the United States of America. 69 (6): 1583–1586. Bibcode:1972PNAS...69.1583S. doi:10.1073/pnas.69.6.1583. PMC 426753. PMID 4556464.
- Trelease, William (July 1924). "Four Generations of Memorable Botanists". The Scientific Monthly. 19 (1): 53–62. Bibcode:1924SciMo..19...53T. JSTOR 7220.

Websites

- "de Candolle, Augustin Pyramus (1778–1841)". International Plant Names Index. 7 January 2009.
- "Candollea". Conservatoire et Jardin botaniques. Ville de Genève.
- Waggoner, Ben (7 July 2000). "Carl Linnaeus (1707–1778)". University of California Museum of Paleontology. University of California. Archived from the original on 30 April 2011. "Linnaeus freely admitted that this produced an "artificial classification", not a natural one, which would take into account all the similarities and differences between organisms."
