= Despot Stefan =

Despot Stefan may refer to:

- Stefan Lazarević, Serbian prince and despot (1389-1427)
- Stefan Branković, Serbian despot, proclaimed in 1458
- Stefan Berislavić, Serbian titular despot, proclaimed in 1520

== See also ==
- Despot (title)
- Stefan (name)
- Despot (disambiguation)
- Stefan (disambiguation)
- Despot Jovan (disambiguation)
