= Stephan (surname) =

Stephan is used as a surname, and may refer to:

- Alexander Stephan (1946–2009), German American Germanist
- Alexander Stephan (footballer) (born 1986), German footballer
- Beat Stephan, Swiss curler
- Bernhard Stephan (born 1943), German director
- Christoph Stephan (born 1986), German biathlete
- Cora Stephan (born 1951), German writer
- Daniel Stephan (born 1973), German handball player
- Dietrich Stephan (born 1969), American geneticist
- Doug Stephan (born 1946), American radio talk show personality
- Édouard Stephan (1837–1923), French astronomer
- Elie Stephan (born 1986), Lebanese basketball player
- Friedrich Stephan (21st century), American scientist
- Friedrich Stephan (soldier) (1892–1945), Wehrmacht Generalleutnant in World War II
- Guillaume Stephan (born 1982), French footballer
- Guy Stéphan (born 1956), France national football team assistant coach
- Hans-Georg Stephan (born 1950), German university professor
- Ilse Stephan (1931–1984), East German interpreter and party functionary of the Socialist Unity Party
- Josh Stephan (born 2001), American baseball player
- Kenneth C. Stephan (21st century), Nebraska Supreme Court justice
- Len Stephan (1935–2012), Australian politician
- Martin Stephan (1777–1846), German American Lutheran pastor
- Robert Stephan (1933–2023), American politician
- Rudi Stephan (1887–1915), German composer
- Ruth Stephan (1925–1975), German actress
- Tobias Stephan (born 1984), Swiss ice hockey player
- Thomas Stephan (born 1970), German politician
- Tom Stephan (21st century), American electronic musician
- Trevor Stephan (born 1995), American baseball player
- Wilfried Stephan (born 1955), German canoeist
