= Prince Stepan =

Prince Stepan may refer to:

- Stepan Khilkov (1785–1854), Russian lieutenant-general, eldest son of Prince Alexander Jacobovich Khilkoff
- Prince Stepan Arkadyevitch Oblonsky, character in the novel Anna Karenina
- Prince Stepan Kasatsky, character in the short story "Father Sergius"

== See also ==
- Stefan (disambiguation)
- Stephan (disambiguation)
