= Stefan (given name) =

Stefan is a masculine given name, a form of the English name Stephen. Variants include Ștefan, Štefan and Stefán.

== People ==
=== Medieval period ===
Ordered chronologically

- Stefan Vojislav (died 1043), Serbian Byzantine governor and Prince of Duklja
- Stefan (archbishop of Uppsala), Sweden, (before 1150–1185), first archbishop from 1164 to 1185
- Stefan Nemanja or Stefan I, Nemanja (c. 1109–1199), grand prince of the Serb state of Raška
- Stefan Nemanjić or Stefan II, Nemanja (1176–1228), proclaimed King of Serbia in 1217
- Stefan Radoslav of Serbia (c. 1192 – c. 1235), King of Serbia, son of Nemanjić
- Stefan Vladislav I of Serbia (died after 1264), son of Stefan Nemanjić
- Stefan Dragutin (died 1316), King of Serbia, son of Stefan Uroš I
- Stefan Uroš II Milutin of Serbia (1282–1321)
- Stefan Vladislav II of Syrmia (1321 – c. 1325)
- Stefan Uroš III Dečanski of Serbia (1321–1331)
- Stefan Uroš IV Dušan of Serbia (Dušan the Mighty) (1331–1355), king 1331–1346; tsar 1346–1355
- Stefan Uroš V of Serbia (Uroš the Weak) (1355–1371), tsar
- Stefan Lazarević (c. 1377–1427), Serbian despot
- Stefan Lochner (c. 1410–1451), German painter
- Stefan Branković (c. 1417–1476), Serbian despot
- Stefan I Crnojević (1426–1465), Lord of Zeta (Montenegro) 1451–1465
- Stefan II Crnojević, lord of Zeta (Montenegro) 1496–1499

=== A–F ===
- Stefan Airapetjan (born 1997), Estonian singer and Eurovision 2022 competitor
- Stefan Andersson (born 1967), Swedish singer-songwriter
- Stefan Andres (1906–1970), German novelist
- Stefan Arndt (born 1961), German film producer and manager
- Stefan Banach (1892–1945), Polish mathematician
- Stefan Baretzki (1919–1988), Romanian-German concentration camp guard
- Stefan Bellof (1957–1985), German racing driver
- Stefan Bereuter (born 1985), German politician
- Stefan Birčević (born 1989), Serbian basketball player
- Stefan Bogoridi (1775–1859), Ottoman statesman of Bulgarian origin
- Stefan Bosse (born 1964), German politician
- Stefan Bradl (born 1989), German motorcycle racer
- Stefan Brink (born 1952), Swedish philologist
- Stefan Brogren (born 1972), Canadian actor, director, and producer
- Stefan Bryła (1886–1943), Polish engineer
- Stefan Brzózka (1931–2023), Polish chess player
- Stefan Burnett (born 1978), American musician, rapper and visual artist
- Stefan Charles (born 1988), American football player
- Stefan Czarniecki (1599–1665), Polish nobleman, general and military commander
- Stefan Dembiński (1887–1972), Polish general
- Stefan Dennis (born 1958), Australian actor
- Stefan Docx (born 1974), Belgian chess player
- Stefan Dohr (born 1965), German horn player
- Stefan Drzewiecki (1844–1938), Polish engineer and inventor
- Stefan Edberg (born 1966), Swedish tennis player
- Stefan Effenberg (born 1968), German footballer
- Stefan Everts (born 1972), Belgian motocross racer
- Stefan Fatsis (born 1963), American author and journalist
- Stefan Florescu (1926/1927–2010), American paralympic swimmer and table tennis player
- Stefan Frenkel (1902–1979), American violinist
- Stefan Fulst-Blei (born 1968), German politician

=== G–M ===
- Stefan George (1868–1933), German poet, editor, and translator
- Stefan Gieren, German film producer and writer
- Stefan Golaszewski, British-Polish writer, performer, and director
- Stefan Grimm (1963–2014), German biologist and professor
- Stefan Groothuis (born 1981), Dutch speed skater
- Stefan Gruhner (born 1984), German politician
- Stefan Heinig (born 1962), German business executive
- Stefan Hell (born 1962), Romanian-born German physicist
- Stefan Holm (born 1976), Swedish high jumper
- Stefan Holt (born 1986/1987), American journalist and TV news anchor
- Stefan Humphries (born 1962), American former football player
- Stefan Ilsanker (born 1989), Austrian footballer
- Stefan Ilsanker (luger) (born 1965), West German luger
- Stefan Jędrychowski (1910–1996), Polish politician
- Stefan de Leval Jezierski (born 1954), American horn player
- Stefan Johansen (born 1991), Norwegian footballer
- Stefan Jović (born 1990), Serbian basketball player
- Stefan Kaczmarz (1895–1939), Polish mathematician
- Stefan Kälin (born 1942), Swiss alpine skier
- Stefan Kalipha (born 1940), British actor originally from Trinidad
- Stefan Kießling (born 1984), German footballer
- Stefan Krämer (born 1966), German football coach
- Stefan Kramer (impressionist) (born 1982), Chilean impressionist
- Stefan Koubek (born 1977), Austrian tennis player
- Stefan Kraft (born 1993), Austrian ski jumper
- Stefan Küng (born 1993), Swiss cyclist
- Stefan Koch (born 1964), German basketball coach
- Stefan Körner (born 1968), German politician
- Stefan Kuntz (born 1962), German footballer
- Stefan Lamanna (born 1995), Canadian soccer player
- Stefan Langerman, Belgian mathematician and computer scientist
- Stefan Lindemann (born 1980), German figure skater
- Stefan Liv (1980–2011), Polish-born Swedish ice hockey goaltender
- Stefan Łodwigowski (1815–1895), Polish composer
- Stefan Löfven (born 1957), Swedish politician and former Prime Minister of Sweden
- Stefan Lövgren (born 1970), Swedish handball player
- Stefan Lulchev (1971–2017), Bulgarian footballer
- Stefan Lux (1888–1936), Slovak journalist
- Stefan Maierhofer (born 1982), Austrian footballer
- Stefan Majewski (born 1956), Polish footballer
- Stefan Mappus (born 1966), German politician
- Stefan Marković (born 1988), Serbian basketball player
- Stefan Matz, German head chef
- Stefan Mayer (1895–1981), Polish intelligence officer
- Stefan Mazurkiewicz (1888–1945), Polish mathematician
- Stefan Mitrović (born 1988), Serbian water polo player
- Stefan Möller (born 1975), German politician
- Stefan Mohr (born 1967), German chess player

=== N–Z ===
- Stefan Nadelman, American film director and animator
- Stefan Niederseer (born 1962), Austrian alpine skier
- Stefan Nigro (born 1996), Australian footballer
- Stefan Nimke (born 1978), German track cyclist
- Stefan Noesen (born 1993), American ice hockey player
- Stefan Nutz (born 1992) Austrian football player
- Stefan Nystrand (born 1981), Swedish swimmer
- Stefan Olsdal (born 1974), Swedish rock guitarist
- Stefan Pejic (born 1988), Welsh actor
- Stefan Peno (born 1997), Serbian basketball player
- Stefan Persson (disambiguation)
- Stefan Pettersson (footballer) (born 1963), Swedish football player
- Stefan Pettersson (ice hockey) (born 1977), Swedish ice hockey player
- Stefan Petzner (born 1981), Austrian BZÖ politician
- Stefan Raab (born 1966), German entertainer, comedian, musician and TV host
- Stefan Raunser (born 1976), German scientist
- Stefan Ravaničanin (c. 1670–after 1733), Serbian monk and chronicler
- Stefan Rehn (born 1966), Swedish football player and manager
- Stefan Reinartz (born 1989), German footballer
- Stefan Reuter (born 1966), German football player and manager
- Stefan Romaniw (1955–2024), Ukrainian-Australian activist
- Stefan Rowecki (1895–1944), Polish general, journalist and leader of the Home Army resistance movement during World War II
- Stefan Ruland (born 1980), German politician
- Stefan Ruzowitzky (born 1961), Austrian film director and screenwriter
- Stefan Rzadzinski (born 1993), Canadian racing driver
- Stefan Sandborg (born 1970), Swedish Army major general
- Stefan Savić (born 1991), Montenegrin footballer
- Stefan Schörghuber (1961–2008), German businessman
- Stefan Schwarz (born 1969), Swedish football player and manager
- Stefan Schumacher (born 1981), German road racing cyclist
- Stefan Skarbek, British songwriter, producer, multi-instrumentalist and singer
- Stefan Sofiyanski (born 1951), Bulgarian politician
- Stefan Soltész (1949–2022), Hungarian-born Austrian conductor
- Stefan Soroka (born 1951), Canadian archbishop
- Stefan Stambolov (1854–1895), Bulgarian journalist, revolutionary and poet
- Stefan Strandberg (born 1990), Norwegian footballer
- Stefan Takov (born 2002), Serbian taekwondo practitioner
- Stefan Toshev (1859–1924), Bulgarian general during World War I
- Stefan de Vrij (born 1992), Dutch footballer
- Stefan Vuksanović, also known online as Mudja (born 1998), Serbian YouTuber
- Stefan Wallin (born 1967), Swedish-Finnish politician
- Stefan Wilmont (born c. 1992), Polish criminal who assassinated the mayor of Gdańsk
- Stefan William (born 1993), Indonesian actor on SCTV
- Stefan Wisniewski (born 1953), German extremist convicted criminal
- Stefan Wul (1922–2003), pseudonym of Pierre Pairault, French science fiction writer
- Stefan Wyszyński (1901–1981), Polish prelate of the Roman Catholic Church
- Stefan Yanev (1939–2024), Bulgarian football player, sports journalist, and author
- Stefan Żeromski (1864–1925), Polish novelist and dramatist
- Stefan Zweig (1881–1942), Austrian novelist, playwright, journalist and biographer

== Fictional characters ==
- King Stefan, father of Princess Aurora in the 1959 Disney animated film Sleeping Beauty
- Stefan DiMera, in the soap opera Days of Our Lives
- Stefan Salvatore, in The Vampire Diaries novel and TV series
- Stefan Urquelle the alter ego of Steve Urkel from the show Family Matters
- Prince Stefan in Barbie as Rapunzel
- Stefan in The Twilight Saga: Breaking Dawn – Part 2
- Stefan Levin, fictional soccer player in Captain Tsubasa manga & anime series

== See also ==
- Stefan (surname), a surname
- Stefa, a female given name
- Stefaan, a masculine given name
- Stefen, a masculine given name
- Stephan (given name), a masculine given name
