= Stevo =

Stevo (Cyrillic: Стево) is a masculine given name and nickname, and a surname. In English, it is also a nickname from the name Steve (Steven or Stephen).

Notable people with the name include:

- Stevo Crvenkovski (1947–2004), Macedonian diplomat
- Stevo Dragišić (born 1971), Serbian politician
- Stevo Glogovac (born 1973), Bosnian Serb footballer, given name Stevan
- Stevo Karapandža (born 1947), Croatian Serb celebrity chef, given name Stefan
- Stevo Klotz (born 2001), American football player
- Stevo Macura (born 1952), Croatian Serb rower
- Stevo Nikolić (born 1984), Bosnian Serb football player
- Stevo Pearce (born 1962), British owner of record label Some Bizzare Records, given name Stephen
- Stevo Pendarovski (born 1963), Macedonian politician
- Stevo Rađenović (fl. 20th c.), Croatian Serb politician and fascist
- Stevo Stepanovski (born 1950), Macedonian bibliophile
- Stevo Teodosievski (1924–1997), Macedonian musician
- Stevo Todorčević (born 1955), Serbian-Canadian mathematician
- Stevo Vasojević, a character in Serbian epic poetry based on a 14th-century nobleman
- Stevo Žigon (1926–2005), Slovene-Serbian actor, given name Štefan
- Steve Jocz (born 1981), nicknamed Stevo, member of the band Sum 41
- Steven Ronald Jensen, nicknamed Stevo, member of the band The Vandals
- Stevica Ristić (born 1983), nicknamed Stevo, Macedonian football (soccer) player currently playing in Korea
- Mike Stephenson (born 1947), nicknamed Stevo, former professional rugby league footballer, now a commentator
- Stevo, a character in the film SLC Punk!
- Stevo Simple Boy (born 1990), Kenyan rapper, given name Stephen
- Stevo the Madman, stage name of Kevin Stephens (born 1984), English footballer

Notable people with the surname include:

- Jean Stevo (1914–1974), Belgian painter and engraver

== See also ==
- Stephenson College, Durham, known colloquially as Stevo
- Steve O. (disambiguation)
- Stephen (disambiguation)
- Stevović
- Stević
