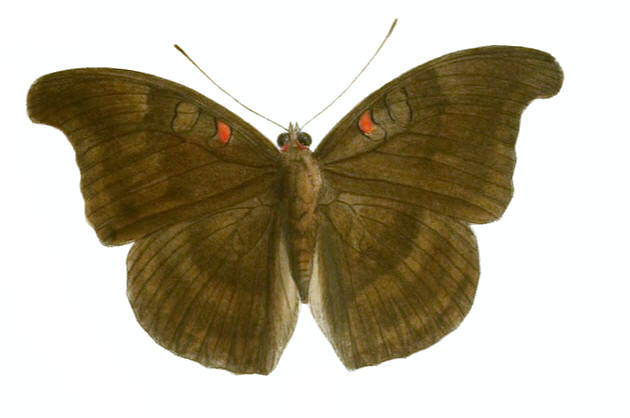

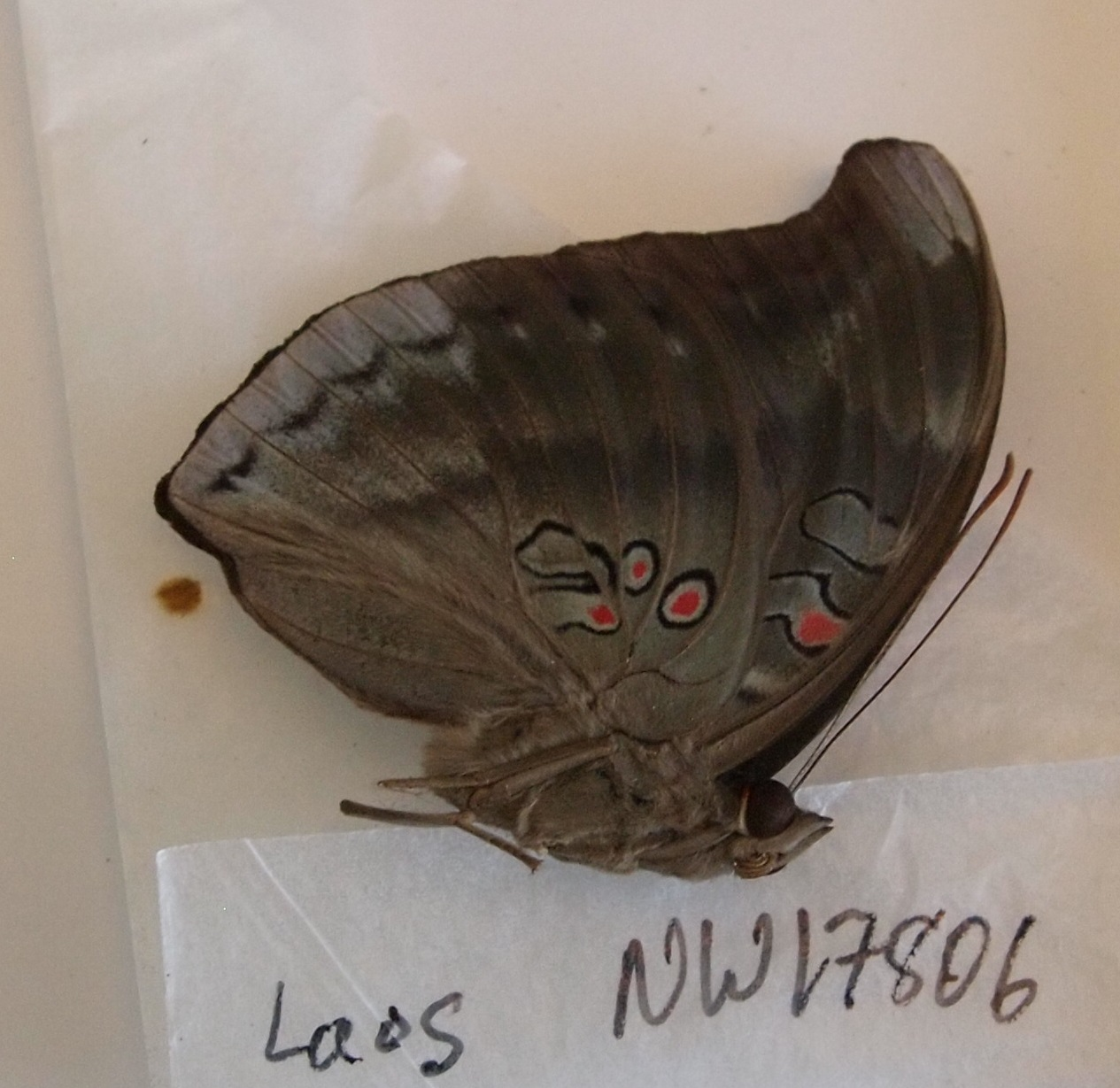

Scientific classification
- Kingdom: Animalia
- Phylum: Arthropoda
- Clade: Pancrustacea
- Class: Insecta
- Order: Lepidoptera
- Family: Nymphalidae
- Genus: Dophla
- Species: D. evelina

Binomial name
- Dophla evelina (Stoll, 1790)

Synonyms
- Euthalia evelina (Stoll, 1790)

= Dophla evelina =

Redspot duke

Species of butterfly

Dophla evelina, the red-spot duke, is a species of brush-footed butterfly found in Cambodia and across South and Southeast Asia, ranging from Sri Lanka, Yunnan, and India to the Philippines and Sulawesi. Many subspecies are recognised. The species was first described by Caspar Stoll in 1790.

== Description ==
Male upperside dark metallic green. Forewing: the cell has two median sinuous short black transverse lines with a crimson spot between them, and two similar lines beyond, one before and one after apex of cell; these are followed by a dark irregular transverse shading between the veins. The apex of the wing is broadly and termen narrowly edged with an obscure dark shading. Hindwing with a slender black loop in the cell; very obscure discal and subterminal dark macular bands; and the anterior third of the wing purplish.

The underside is sap green, largely suffused with plumbeous grey. The forewing has the transverse slender black lines and a crimson spot as on the upperside, along with a very obscure subterminal series of dark spots parallel to terminal margin. The hindwing has three crimson spots encircled by slender black loops near the base, and a very obscure subterminal series of dark spots continuing that on the forewing, but becoming obsolescent posteriorly. Antennae brown; head with a crimson streak behind the eyes; thorax and abdomen greenish brown, beneath greyish.

The female is very similar, with nearly identical markings above and below, but the ground colour on upperside paler, especially on the terminal halves of the wings, in contrast with the darker basal portions.

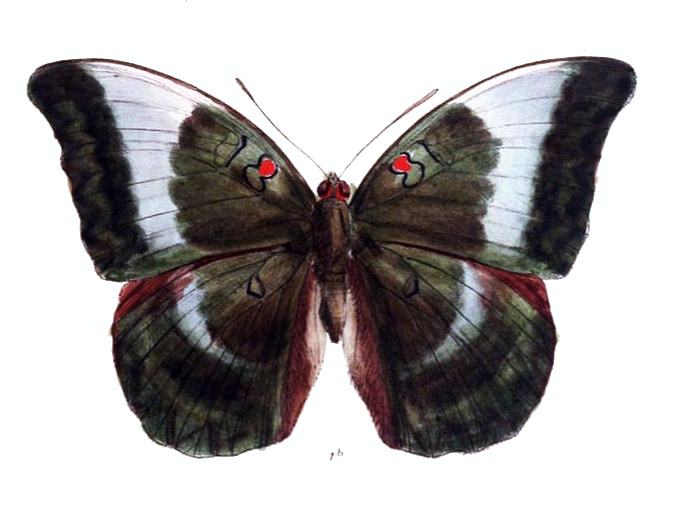
D. e. laudabilis

Subspecies laudabilis C. Swinhoe: The southern Indian continental representative of D. evelina seems to form a very distinct race. The male differs in the costa of the forewing on the upperside beyond the obscure dark discal band, being broadly greyish white with a silvery lustre up to a short distance before the apex of the wing; this colour spreads diffusely downwards, but does not extend below vein 6. In the female, there is a similar patch, very wide on the costa, extending as a broad transverse band with an outer diffuse and inner sinuous margin right across the wing to vein 1; on the hindwing, it is represented by a very much narrower transverse diffuse band or irroration of grey scales. Underside of the male and female as in the typical form, but more densely suffused with plumbeous grey. Antennae, head, thorax and abdomen as in the typical form.

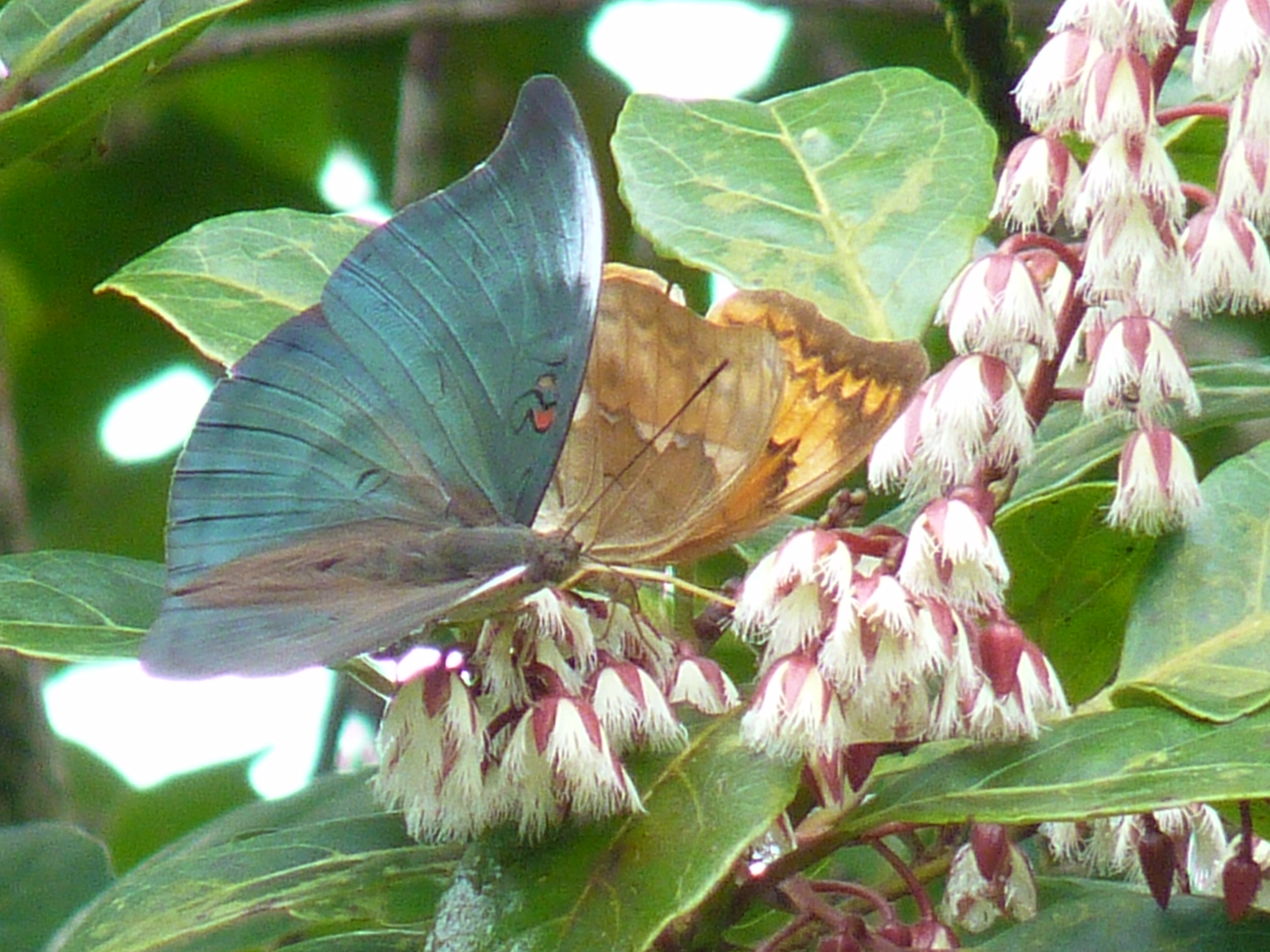
Redspot duke with Tamil yeomen in Kudremukha National Park, Karnataka

== Life history ==
Larva: The larva of D. e. laudabilis feeds on Diospyros candolleana (Ebenaceae) and is green with a vinaceous (red-wine colour) dorsal patch on each segment, enclosing a whitish dark-centred eyespot. These patches vary in size, those on the fourth, seventh and tenth segments usually being the largest, and those on the fifth and sixth being small or obsolete.

Pupa: "Green, with silver spots and a bright line of the same colour along the sides of the dorsal triangle."

At least on Borneo, but probably elsewhere too, adults are frequently seen drinking juices from old fruits. They indiscriminately seek out such sources of nutrition, whether these are in the shade of the forest or in drier and sunnier open areas.
