= Stephanie (disambiguation) =

Stephanie is a female name.

Stephanie or Stefanie may also refer to:

== Arts, entertainment, and media ==
- Stefanie (film), a 1958 West German comedy film
- Stephanie (film), a 2017 horror film
- Stefanie (album), a 2004 album by Stefanie Sun
- Stephanie (LazyTown), a fictional character from the TV show LazyTown
- Stephanie (The Walking Dead)

== Places ==
- Lake Stefanie, a lake in Southern Ethiopia

== See also ==
- Stef
- Stefani (disambiguation)
- Stefania (disambiguation)
- Steff
- Steffl
- Stephan (disambiguation)
- Stephen (disambiguation)
