= Despot Jovan =

Despot Jovan may refer to:

- Jovan Oliver, Serbian nobleman, awarded with the title of despot c. 1346
- Jovan Uglješa, Serbian nobleman, awarded with the title of despot c. 1365
- Jovan Dragaš, Serbian nobleman, awarded with the title of despot c. 1365
- Jovan Branković, Serbian titular despot, proclaimed c. 1494
- Jovan Berislavić, Serbian titular despot, proclaimed c. 1504

== See also ==
- Despot (title)
- Despot (disambiguation)
- Jovan (given name)
- Despot Stefan (disambiguation)
