= Stephen (disambiguation) =

Stephen is a masculine given name.

Stephen may also refer to:

== People ==
- Stephen (surname), including a list of people with the surname
- Stephen (honorific), a South Slavic medieval honorific

== Places ==
- Stephen, Minnesota, United States
- Mount Stephen, a mountain in British Columbia

== Music ==
- "Stephen", a 1976 song by Neil Sedaka
- "Stephen", a 2010 song by Veronica Falls
- "Stephen" (song), a 2010 song by Kesha
- "Stephen, Stephen", a song by The Apples in Stereo

== Entertainment ==
- Stephen (film), a 2025 Indian film
- Stephen (TV series), a 2021 British television series

== See also ==
- List of people with given name Stephen
- Stefen
- Stephan (disambiguation)
- Stephens (disambiguation)
- Stevens (disambiguation)
- Steve (disambiguation)
- Steve O. (disambiguation)
- Stevo (disambiguation)
- Stephanie (disambiguation)
- Stephania (disambiguation)
