= Despotović =

Despotović (Serbian Cyrillic: Деспотовић) is a Serbian surname, derived from word despot ("master, lord"). Notable people with the surname include:

- Đorđe Despotović (born 1992), Serbian footballer
- Frane Despotović (born 1982), Croatian futsal player
- Jelena Despotović (born 1994), Montenegrin handball player
- Jovan Despotović (born 1952), Serbian art historian and critic
- Petar Despotović (born 1988), Serbian basketball player
- Ranko Despotović (born 1983), Serbian footballer
- Veljko Despotović (1931–2013), Serbian film and television production designer
- Vesna Despotović (born 1961), Serbian basketball player
- Zoran Despotović (born 1965), Serbian politician

== See also ==
- Despot (surname)
