= Bereuter =

Bereuter is a surname. It may refer to:

- Doug Bereuter (born 1939) , American retired politician from the state of Nebraska
- Stefan Bereuter (born 1985), German politician
