= Stefani =

Stefani may refer to:

== Places ==
- Stefani, Boeotia, a settlement in Boeotia, Greece
- Stefani, Corinthia, a village in the municipal unit of Tenea
- Stefani, Preveza, a village in the municipality of Louros, Preveza regional unit, Greece
- Stefani, Trikala, a village in the municipality of Kalampaka, Trikala regional unit, Greece

== Other uses ==
- Stefani (name)
- 4624 Stefani (1982 FV2), a main-belt asteroid
- Agenzia Stefani, an Italian news agency
- SS Stefani, a Hansa A Type cargo ship in service 1964-44

== See also ==
- Stephanie (disambiguation)
- Stefan (disambiguation)
- Stephani
