= Stepania =

Stepania may refer to:

- Stepania (given name), a feminine given name of Greek origin
- Vladimir Stepania (born 1976), Georgian basketball player

== See also ==
- Stefania (disambiguation)
- Stephania (disambiguation)
