= Docx (disambiguation) =

Docx may refer to:

- A file format, especially for Office Open XML documents
- Edward Docx (born 1972), British writer
- Mieke Docx (born 1996), Belgian cyclist
- Stefan Docx (born 1974), Belgian chess player
