= Ivan Despot =

Croatian theologian and writer

Ivan Despot O. F. M. (Zaostrog, 1851 – Split, 1886) was a Croatian theologian, priest, translator, writer and poet.

== Life ==
Ivan was the son of Mate Despot (1812 - 1895) and Kata Matutinović (1822 - 1855) born in Zaostrog. He learned to read and write at the Franciscan monastery of St. Mary consequently joining the seminary in Sinj. He later took theological studies in Šibenik and Makarska (1869–74). After being ordained a priest he became a professor of philosophy and later a parish priest in Sumartin on the island Brač. He translated many Latin, Italian, French literary works from to Croatian. He wrote poems, short-stories, novels, literary criticism as well as political and historical articles. From 1872 he published in many magazines of the time such as Dragoljub, Glas Hercegovca, Hrvatska, Hrvatska vila, Hrvatski dom, Iskra, Katolički list, La Dalmazia cattolica — Katolička Dalmacija, Nada, Narod, Narodni list, Narodni koledar, Obzor, Slava preporoditeljem, Slovinac, Sriemski Hrvat i Vienac. His literary correspondence included Stanko Vraz, August Šenoa, Franjo Marković and others.

After having died at the young age of 34 from tuberculosis he was buried in the Franciscan monastery of St. Mary in Zaostrog. His bust was made by the famous sculptor Ivan Rendić.

His nephew was Ilija Despot, an author and poet.

=== Bibliography ===
- Tebi Mate Andrijaševiću koji prvi skoknu, lukavce smete, narod osvitla, ovu pismu posvećujem (1873)
- Oporuka Pavla Šubića Bribirskoga (1880)
- Prve iskre, pjesme (1881)
- August Šenoa (1882)
- Put na Lovćen (1883)
- Malo zrnja (1885)
- Na vjenčanju d. g. Nelke Rendić i vrlog Petra Dr. Deškovića (1885)
- Odabrana djela (1989)
