= Despot (surname) =

Despot is a Croatian and Serbian surname.

In Croatia, they are mostly from the environs of Ploče, where it was once the most common surname in Zaostrog, but today it is chiefly found in Zagreb, followed by Rijeka, Šibenik and Vinkovci. Many of its members have emigrated to South Africa, among other countries.

It may refer to:

- Blaženka Despot (1930–2001), Croatian philosopher and sociologist
- Branko Despot (born 1942), Croatian philosopher
- Dragan Despot (born 1956), Croatian actor
- Ilija Despot (1885–1970), Croatian poet and writer
- Veljko Despot (born 1948), Croatian record producer

== See also ==
- Despotović

== Bibliography ==
- Moj.hr (n.d.). "Prezime Despot". Acta Croatica (in Croatian).
