= Stefaan =

Stefaan is a Dutch-language masculine given name, a version of Stephen, that is most common in Belgium. People with this name include:

- Stefaan De Clerck (born 1951), Belgian politician and former Minister of Justice
- Stefaan Engels (born 1961), Belgian long-distance runner who ran 365 marathons in one year
- Stefaan Maene (born 1972), Belgian swimmer
- Stefaan Simons (born c. 1960), British chemical engineer
- Stefaan Tanghe (born 1972), Belgian footballer
- Stefaan Van Hecke (born 1973), Belgian politician
- Stefaan Verhulst (born 1966), American technology writer

== See also ==
- Stefan, a masculine given name
