= Stefania (disambiguation) =

Stefania is a genus of tree frogs.

Stefania may also refer to:

- Stefania (name), a female name
- Stefania, Greater Poland Voivodeship, a village in west-central Poland
- Stefania, Łódź Voivodeship, a village in central Poland
- Stefania (crater), a crater on Venus
- Stefania (song), a song by Kalush Orchestra, which won the 2022 Eurovision Song Contest
- Stefania (singer) (b. 2002), a Greek-Dutch singer

== See also ==
- Stephanie (disambiguation)
- Stefan (disambiguation)
- Stephen (disambiguation)
