= Stevović =

Stevović (Serbian Cyrillic: Стевовић, pronounced [stêːʋoʋitɕ]) is a Serbian and Montenegrin surname derived from a masculine given name Stevo. Notable people with the surname include:

- Ivan Stevović (1910–1999), Yugoslav football manager and player
- Marko Stevović (born 1996), Serbian alpine skier
- Ratko Stevović (born 1956), Montenegrin football manager
