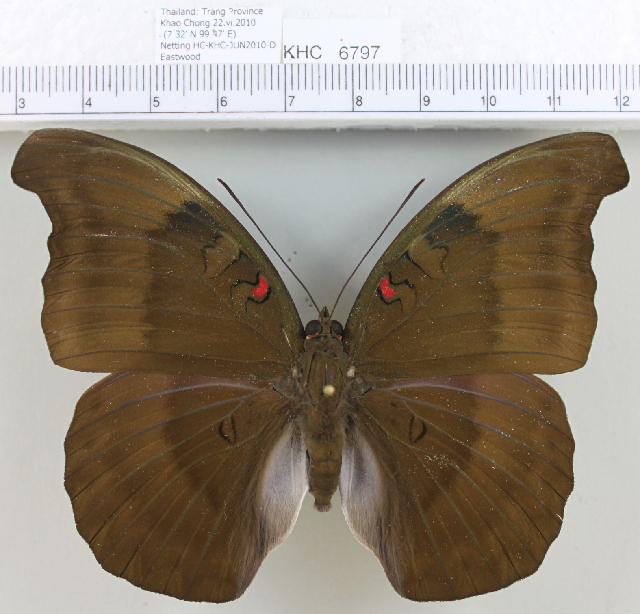
- Dophla evelina

Scientific classification
- Domain: Eukaryota
- Kingdom: Animalia
- Phylum: Arthropoda
- Class: Insecta
- Order: Lepidoptera
- Family: Nymphalidae
- Tribe: Adoliadini
- Genus: Dophla; Moore, [1880]

= Dophla =

Genus of brush-footed butterflies

Dophla is a genus of butterflies in the family Nymphalidae (Limenitidinae)

== Species ==
- Dophla evelina (Stoll, [1790])
- Dophla pulchella C.L. Lee, 1979 (Tibet)
