= Théorie Élémentaire de la Botanique =

1813 book by Augustin Pyramus de Candolle

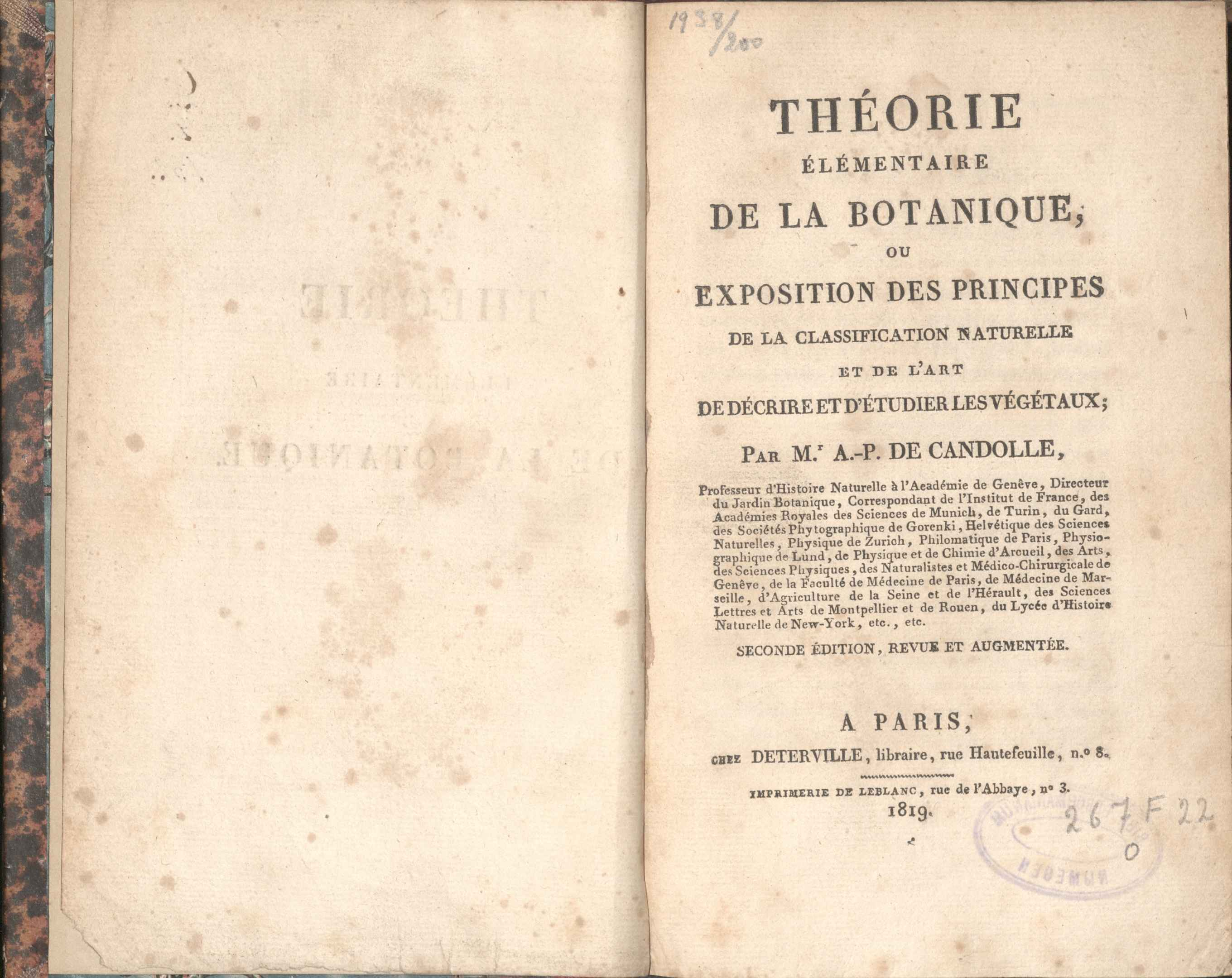
- Author: Augustin Pyramus de Candolle
- Language: French; German; English
- Published: 1813
- English publication date: 1821

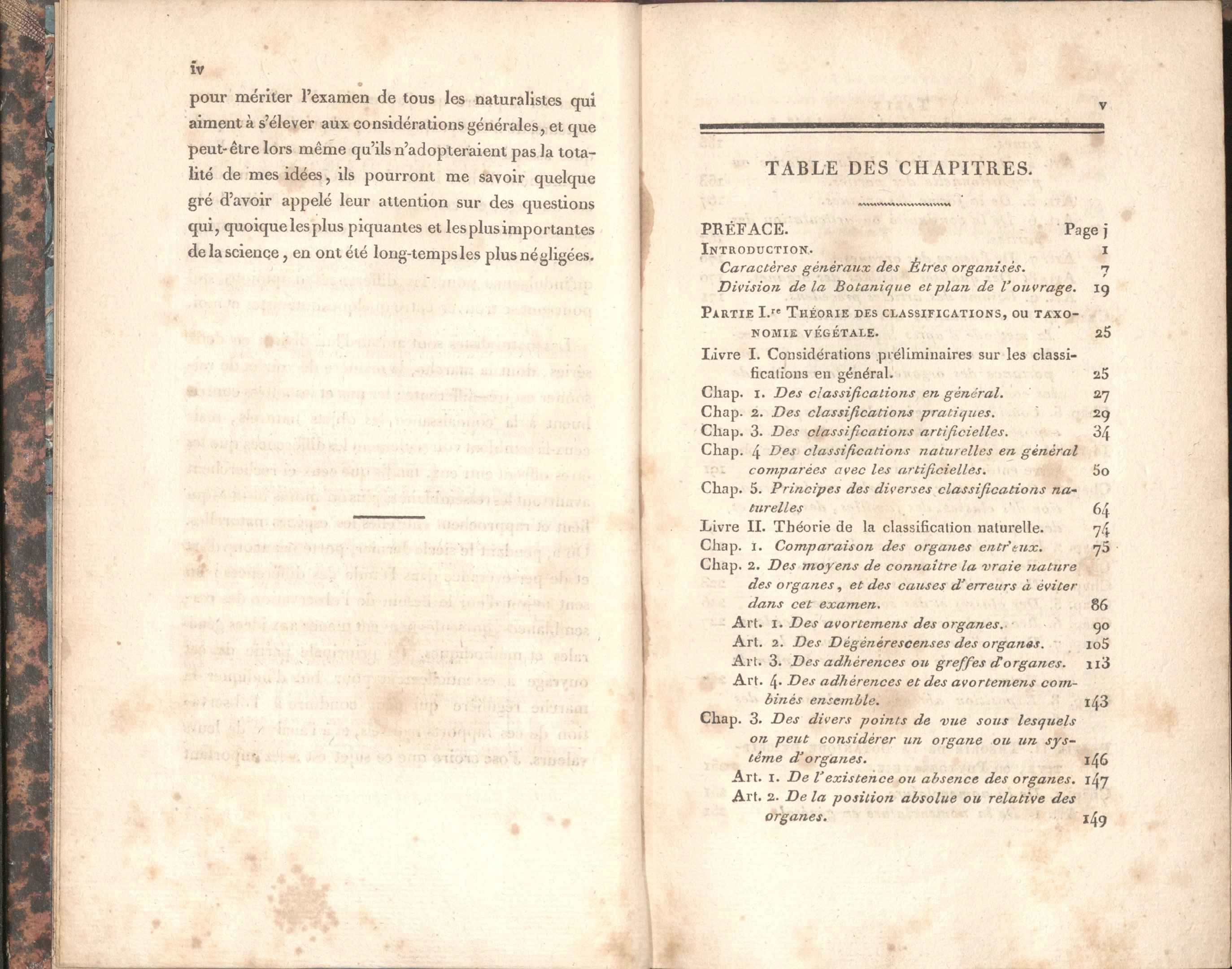
Table of contents

Théorie Élémentaire de la Botanique is a book written by Swiss botanist Augustin Pyramus de Candolle, which was first published in 1813 and later re-issued in 1819 with a new edition. This book contributed to the field of botany by introducing the use of the term taxonomy and a new classification system for grouping plants together. This book placed emphasis on the study of evolutionary relationships in grouping plants together, rather than on shared morphological characteristics.

== Context ==
After studying science and law at the Geneva Academy, de Candolle began his formal botanical career when, upon the recommendation of Renè Loiche Desfontaines, de Candolle began to work at Charles Louis L’Hèritier de Brutelle’s herbarium in the summer of 1798. After establishing his first discovered genus, Senebiera, in 1799, de Candolle published his first books, Plantarum Historia Succulentarum in 1799 and Astragalogia in 1802. In 1805, Jean-Baptiste Lamark put de Candolle in charge of the publication of the third edition of Lamark’s Flore Française and writing the introduction of Principes Élémentaire de Botanique. In this introduction, de Candolle proposed a discrete model of classifying plant taxa that was opposed to the linear model of Carl Linnaeus.

After being appointed as a professor of botany at the University of Montpellier in 1807 and becoming the first Chair of Botany in the medical faculty of the university, de Candolle published his book Théorie Élémentaire de la Botanique in 1813, which was later reissued in 1819.

== Contents ==
The book was a seminal work and revolutionary contribution to the field of botanical classification and research. First published in 1813, the book provides an exhaustive collection of the principles of scientific botany, including the nomenclature, classification, and phytography.

The book is divided into three main parts, each focusing on a distinct area of botanical study:

- Part I - Theory of Classifications, or Plant Taxonomy, is the first section and explores the principles of natural classification, including the use of morphological characteristics and the significance of evolutionary relationships in classifying plant species.
- Part II - Theory of Descriptive Botany, or Phytography, is the second section that covers the science of describing and studying plants, including how to observe and record plant characteristics, with the aid of tools such as herbariums and microscopes.
- Part III - Knowledge of the Terms, or Botanical Glossology, is the final section and delves into a detailed analysis of the numerous plant families and their characteristics, providing a valuable resource for botanists. This also includes a description of the physiology of plants, including the structure and function of plants and their organs.

In this book, De Candolle introduced for the first time the word "taxonomy" related to the practice of botanical classification. The word is derived from a combination of two ancient Greek words: taxis meaning arrangement and nomos meaning rules or law. The book is also notable for its detailed descriptions of plant families and their characteristics, as well as its emphasis on the importance of evolutionary relationships, providing a valuable resource for botanists.

== Reception ==
The book, first published in French in 1813, was reissued in 1819 and soon translated to German by Kurt Sprengel, who expanded on the ideas presented in the book in respect to the structure of plants and also included his own ideas about the distribution of plants. In 1821, the German translation was translated to English, and the English translator noted that the textbook successfully documents the recent advances in botany and represents both the current wealth of established knowledge and the very latest emerging theories in plant science at the time. A year later, in 1820 de Candolle would publish one of his most significant works, "Essai élémentaire de géographie botanique" which contained information on biogeography not found in any of his previous works, with the exception of the German translation by Sprengel, in where Sprengel expanded on these ideas based loosely on Candolle’s ones.

The reception for the book was positive, with de Candolle being considered one of the "founding fathers" of natural systematics thanks to this work, in which he introduced a new classification system and the term taxonomy. Beyond the field of biology, the book was well received by some notable people of the time, such as Jean-Baptiste Say, who wrote a letter to de Candolle telling him that his book put him "amongst the best philosophers", and William Whewell, who quoted de Candolle on several occasions.

After the first publication in 1813, de Candolle received criticisms from proponents of intelligent design for dealing with the problem of useless organs in plants. The critics claimed that his argument would embolden and give arguments to the proponents of the world as a product of chance. In the 1819 edition, de Candolle addresses this issue by claiming that these "mistakes" in the designs of plants can help as evidence for intelligent design, as they can function as a way to achieve symmetry. Charles Darwin later criticized these ideas, claiming that: "At a period not far distant, naturalists will hear with surprise, perhaps with derision, that grave and learned men formerly maintained that such useless organs were not remnants retained by inheritance, but were specially created and arranged in their proper places like dishes on a table (this is the simile of a distinguished botanist) by an Omnipotent hand to complete the scheme of nature." In the third edition of the book, published by Alphonse de Candolle (de Candolle’s son) in 1844, a footnote mentions that the corresponding pages for the argument were crossed out by his father, indicating that his father had intention to change them.

From 1813 to his death in 1841, de Candolle continued to form and refine his new botanical classification system which was established in Théorie Élémentaire de la Botanique. In 1824, de Candolle began the publication of the collection, Prodromus Systematis Naturalis Regni Vegetabilis, a summary of all plant types known at the time along with their characteristics, including taxonomy, evolutionary history, and biogeography. He completed the first seven volumes of the total seventeen of this collection prior to his death. Despite not completing his goal for the collection, he characterized more than 100 plant families in this process, which became a base for the field of studying general botany. The final ten volumes were completed by de Candolle's son, Alphonse Pyramus de Candolle, with the seventeenth published in 1873.
