= Stephania (disambiguation) =

Stephania is a genus of flowering plants in the family Menispermaceae.

Stephania may also refer to:

- 220 Stephania, a main-belt asteroid
- Stephania (given name), a feminine given name of Greek origin

== See also ==
- Stefania (disambiguation)
- Stepania (disambiguation)
- Stephanian (disambiguation)
