= Despot =

Despot may refer to:

- Despot (court title), a Byzantine court title
- Despotism, a form of government in which power is concentrated in the hands of one individual
- Despot (rapper), rapper Alec Reinstein's stage name
- Šifra Despot, a TV series
- Despot (vehicle), armoured multifunctional vehicle

== People with the given name ==
- Despot Badžović (1850–1930), teacher, activist of the Serbian national movement

== People with the surname ==
- Despot (surname)
- Blaženka Despot (1930–2001), Croatian philosopher and sociologist
- Branko Despot (1942–), Croatian philosopher
- Dragan Despot (1956–), Croatian actor
- Iacob Heraclid Despot (1527–1563), Prince of Moldavia
- Ilija Despot (1885–1970), Croatian poet and writer
- Veljko Despot (born 1948), Croatian record producer
