= Stephanian =

Stephanian can refer to:

- Stephanian (stage), a stage in the European stratigraphy of the Carboniferous
- Stephanian school of literature, a body of fictional works written by the alumni of St. Stephen's College, Delhi
- A student at St. Stephen's College, Delhi, a college of the University of Delhi, India

== See also ==
- Stephania (disambiguation)
