= Steve O. =

Steve O. may refer to:

- Steve-O (born Stephen Gilchrist Glover, 1974), stunt performer and television personality, most famous for Jackass
  - Dr. Steve-O (2007 TV series), TV show starring Stephen Gilchrist Glover
- Steve Jocz (born 1981), Canadian musician of rock band Sum 41
- Steve Oedekerk (born 1961), American actor, comedian and filmmaker
- Steve Olsonoski (born 1953), American professional wrestler under the stage name Steve O
- Steve-O, disc jockey at station KISO

== See also ==
- Stevo (disambiguation)
- Stephen (disambiguation)
- O (disambiguation)
