= Stefani (name) =

Stefani is a name of Greek and Italian origin.

== People with the given name ==
- Stefani Staats (born 1990)
- Stefani Bismpikou (born 1988), Greek Olympic gymnast
- Stefani Carter (born 1978), Texas politician
- Stefani Germanotta (born 1986), American pop singer, also known as Lady Gaga
- Stefani Hid (born 1985), Indonesian writer
- Stefani Miglioranzi (born 1977), Brazilian-American footballer
- Stefani Popova (born 1993), Bulgarian biathlete
- Stefani Schaeffer (born 1974), American attorney and TV presenter
- Stefani Stoeva (born 1995), Bulgarian badminton player
- Stefani Werremeier (born 1968), German Olympic rower

== People with the surname ==
- Alberto De Stefani (1879–1969), Italian politician
- Andrea Stefani (journalist), Albanian journalist
- Andrea Stefani (composer), Italian monk, flagellant, poet, singer and composer
- Attila Stefáni (born 1973), Hungarian motorcycle speedway rider
- Catherine Stefani, American politician
- Danilo Stefani (born 1979), Italian footballer
- Enrico Stefani, Italian architect and archaeologist
- Eric Stefani (born 1967), American musician and animator
- Francesco Stefani (film director) (1923–1989), German film director
- Francesco Stefani (born 1971), Italian slalom canoer
- Graciela Stefani (born 1960), Argentine screen and stage actress
- Guglielmo Stefani (1819–1861), Italian journalist
- Gwen Stefani (born 1969), American pop, rock, R&B and ska singer
- Irene Stefani (1891–1930), born Aurelia Mercede Stefani, Italian member of the Consolata Missionary Sisters
- Joseph De Stefani (1879–1940), American character actor
- Julian Stefani (born 1939), Australian politician
- Lorraine Stefani, British higher education academic
- Luca Stefani (born 1987), Italian long track speed skater
- Luis Stefani, Chancellor of the University of Puerto Rico
- Luisa Stefani (born 1997), Brazilian tennis player
- Margaret Stefani (1917–1964), infielder and chaperone in the All-American Girls Professional Baseball League
- Mario Stefani (1938–2001, Italian poet
- Mirko Stefani (born 1984), Italian footballer
- Pier Luigi Stefani, Italian TV producer
- Shawn Stefani (born 1981), American professional golfer
- Simon Stefani (1929–2000), Albanian politician
- Stefano Stefani (born 1938), Venetist Italian politician
- Tommaso de Stefani (c. 1250–c. 1310), Italian painter of the Renaissance period
- Paul Michael Stephani, US killer and prisoner

== Other people known as Stefani ==
- Anna Ponomarenko (born 1994), Ukrainian Olympic B-Girl Breaker

== See also ==
- Stefani (disambiguation)
- Stefano
- Stephanie
