= Štefan =

Štefan is a Slavic given name and surname. Notable people with the name include:

== Given name ==
- Štefan Babjak (1931–2008), Slovak classical baritone opera singer
- Štefan Banič (1870–1941), Slovak inventor who patented an early parachute design
- Štefan Čambal (1908–1990), Slovak football player and manager
- Štefan Chrtianský (disambiguation), multiple people
- Štefan Füle (born 1962), Czech diplomat
- Štefan Gerec (born 1992), Slovak football striker
- Štefan Hadalin (born 1995), Slovenian alpine ski racer
- Štefan Harabin (born 1957), Slovak judge and politician
- Štefan Horný (born 1957), Slovak football player
- Štefan Jačiansky (1930–1995), Slovak football manager
- Štefan Kvietik (1936–2025), Slovak actor
- Štefan Maixner (born 1968), Slovak football striker
- Štefan Malík (born 1966), Slovak race walker
- Štefan Martiš Slovak fighter ace during World War II
- Štefan Matlák (1934–2003), Slovak footballer
- Štefan Moyses (1797–1869), Slovak bishop
- Štefan Pekár (born 1988), Slovak footballer
- Štefan Planinc (born 1925), Slovene surrealist painter
- Štefan Rosina (born 1987), Slovak racing driver
- Štefan Rusnák (born 1971), Slovak international football forward
- Štefan Ružička (born 1985), Slovak ice hockey player
- Štefan Senecký (born 1980), Slovak football goalkeeper
- Štefan Škaper (born 1966), Slovenian football striker
- Štefan Tarkovič (born 1973), Slovak football manager
- Štefan Tiso (1897–1959), Slovak lawyer and Supreme Court president
- Štefan Žáry (1918–2007), Slovak poet, prosaist, translator and essayist
- Štefan Zaťko (born 1962), Slovak football manager
- Štefan Znám (1936–1993), Slovak-Hungarian mathematician
- Štefan Zošák (born 1984), Slovak football midfielder

== Surname ==
- Anja Štefan (snowboarder) (born 1988), Croatian snowboarder
- Anja Štefan (writer), Slovene writer, poet and story teller
- Patrik Štefan (born 1980), Czech ice hockey player

== See also ==
- Stefan
- Stephen
