= Julien Stéphan =

French footballer and manager (born 1980)

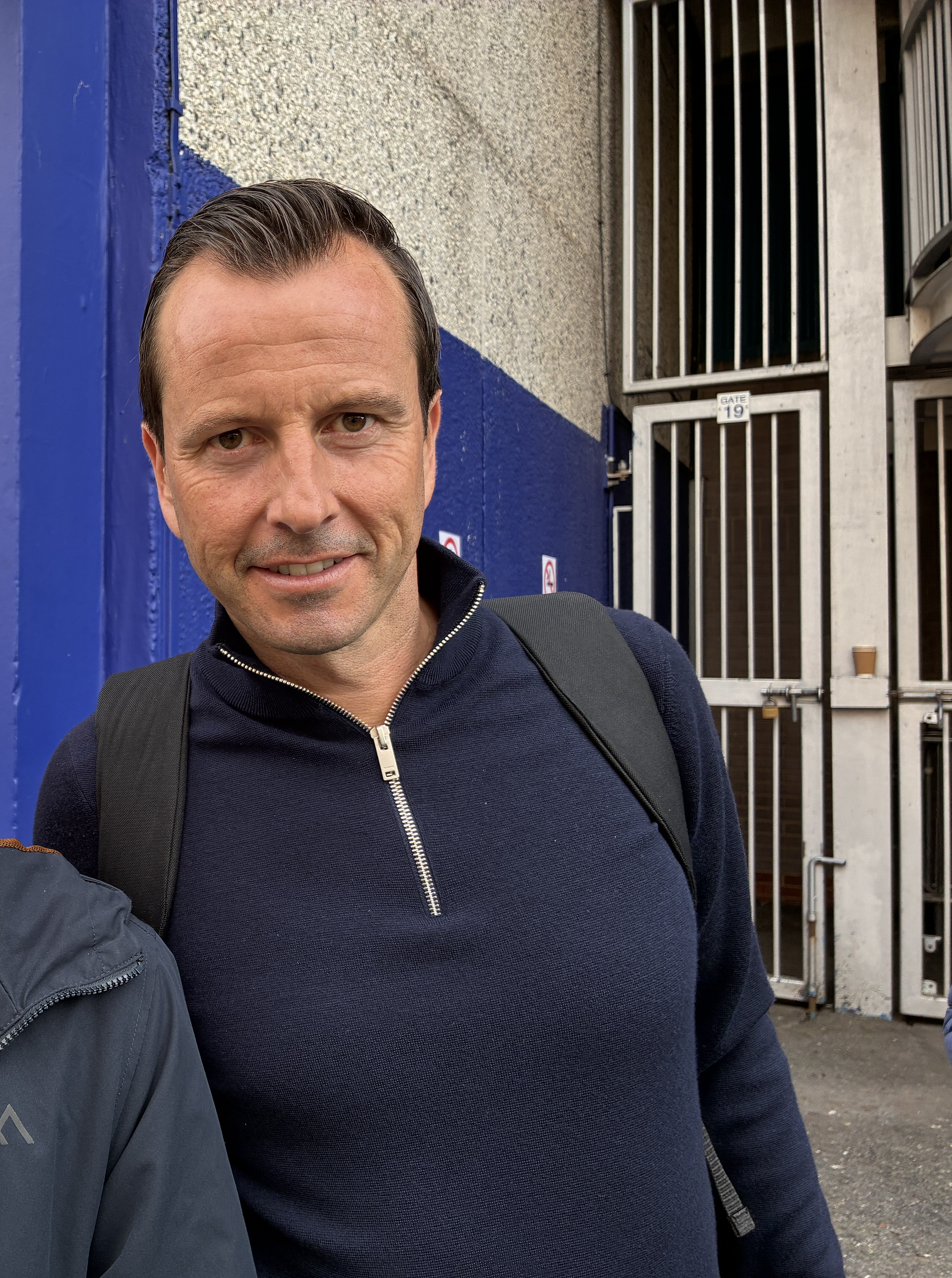
- Stéphan as Queens Park Rangers manager in 2025

Personal information
- Date of birth: 18 September 1980 (age 46)
- Place of birth: Rennes, Ille-et-Vilaine, France
- Height: 1.83 m (6 ft 0 in)
- Position: Defensive midfielder

Team information
- Current team: Queens Park Rangers (Head Coach)

Senior career*
| Years | Team | Apps | (Gls) |
| 1998–2001 | Paris Saint-Germain B | 6 | (0) |
| 2001–2002 | Toulouse | 4 | (0) |
| 2002–2003 | RC Paris | 19 | (1) |
| 2003–2005 | Stade Briochin | 51 | (3) |
| 2005–2008 | Drouais | | |

Managerial career
- 2015–2018: Rennes II
- 2018–2021: Rennes
- 2021–2023: Strasbourg
- 2023–2024: Rennes
- 2025–: Queens Park Rangers
- * Club domestic league appearances and goals

Julien Stéphan (born 18 September 1980) is a French professional football manager and former player who is the current head coach of EFL Championship club Queens Park Rangers.

As a player, he was as a defensive midfielder. From December 2018 to March 2021, Stéphan managed his hometown club Rennes, winning the 2018–19 Coupe de France, before managing Strasbourg from July 2021 to January 2023. In November 2023, he was reappointed as manager of Rennes before being dismissed a year later.

== Early life ==
Stéphan was born in Rennes, Ille-et-Vilaine, France.

== Managerial career ==
On 3 December 2018, Sabri Lamouchi was sacked as manager of Ligue 1 club Rennes due to poor results. While initially given a role as interim manager, Stéphan was given the permanent role nine days later after a string of victories including against Astana in the UEFA Europa League, qualifying Rennes for their first ever European knockout round. After dispatching Real Betis, the club lost 4–3 on aggregate to Arsenal in the last 16.

Stéphan led Rennes to their first trophy in 48 years on 27 April 2019 in the Coupe de France, beating Paris Saint-Germain 6–5 in a penalty shoot-out in the final after drawing 2–2. He faced the same opponents on 3 August in the 2019 Trophée des Champions, a 2–1 loss. In the 2019–20 season, Stéphan's Rennes team finished in third place when the season was curtailed by the COVID-19 pandemic, therefore qualifying for the first time to the UEFA Champions League. He resigned on 1 March 2021, after four straight defeats and seven games without a win.

In July 2021, Stéphan was appointed as manager of Ligue 1 club Strasbourg. In his first season, he led the club to a sixth-place finish in the top flight, a first since the 1979–80 season. In January 2023, with Strasbourg sitting in nineteenth place with one win from seventeen games, Stéphan was dismissed.

On 19 June 2025, rumours emerged that Stephan had been in talks with Queens Park Rangers over the manager position at the Championship club and was on the verge of signing a two year deal. His appointment was officially confirmed on 25 June.

== Personal life ==
Stéphan is the son of former France national team assistant manager Guy Stéphan and the brother of Guillaume Stéphan, also a former footballer.

== Managerial statistics ==
As of match played 21 November 2026

Managerial record by team and tenure
| Team | From | To | Record | | | | | Ref. |
| Team | From | To | P | W | D | L | Win % | Ref. |
|---|---|---|---|---|---|---|---|---|
| Rennes II | 1 July 2015 | 3 December 2018 | 97 | 43 | 28 | 26 | 44.3 | |
| Rennes | 3 December 2018 | 1 March 2021 | 110 | 46 | 28 | 36 | 41.8 | |
| Strasbourg | 1 July 2021 | 9 January 2023 | 58 | 19 | 21 | 18 | 32.8 | |
| Rennes | 19 November 2023 | 7 November 2024 | 41 | 18 | 7 | 16 | 43.9 | |
| Queens Park Rangers | 25 June 2025 | Present | 65 | 23 | 17 | 25 | 35.4 | |
| Total | | | 371 | 149 | 101 | 121 | 40.2 | |

== Honours ==
=== Manager ===
Rennes II

- Championnat de France Amateur: 2016–17
- Championnat de France Amateur 2: 2015–16

Rennes

- Coupe de France: 2018–19
