= Stephan =

Stephan may refer to:

- Stephan, South Dakota, United States
- Stephan (given name), a masculine given name
- Stephan (surname), a Breton-language surname

== See also ==
- Sankt-Stephan
- Stefan (disambiguation)
- Stephan-Oterma
- Stephani
- Stephen (disambiguation)
- von Stephan
