= Štefan Chrtianský =

Štefan Chrtianský may refer to:

- Štefan Chrtianský (born 1962), Czechoslovak volleyball player, see Czechoslovakia men's national volleyball team
- Štefan Chrtianský (born 1989), Slovak volleyball player
