= Guy Stéphan =

French football manager (born 1956)

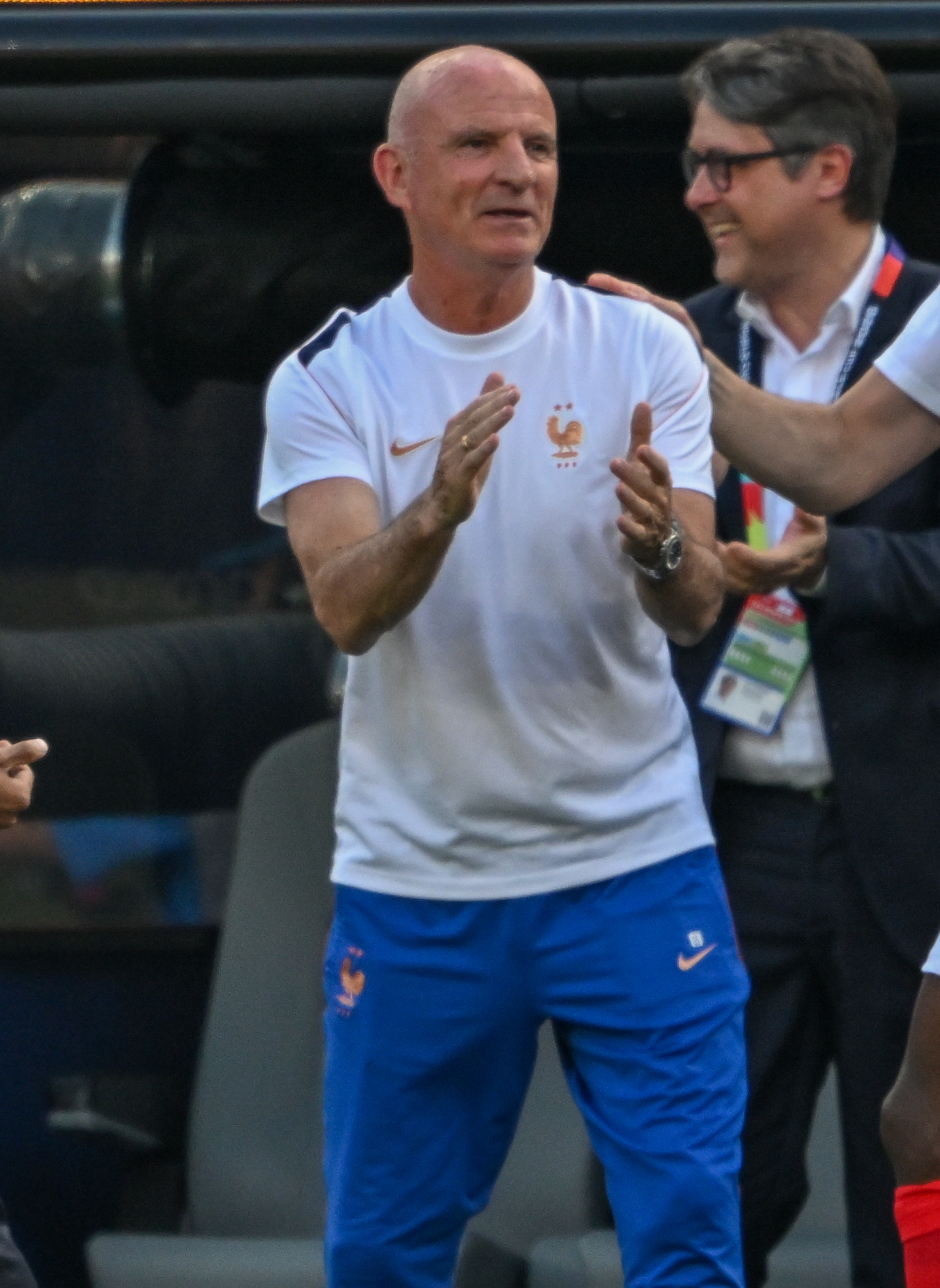
- Stéphan at the 2026 FIFA World Cup

Personal information
- Full name: Guy Stéphan
- Date of birth: 17 October 1956 (age 70)
- Place of birth: Ploumilliau, France
- Height: 1.75 m (5 ft 9 in)
- Position: Forward

Senior career*
Years	Team	Apps	(Gls)
1976–1980	Guingamp	95	(31)
1980–1981	Rennes	22	(2)
1981–1983	Le Havre	51	(10)
1983–1985	Orléans	61	(9)
1985–1987	Caen	35	(6)
Total		264	(58)

Managerial career
- 1986–1987: Caen reserves
- 1987–1988: Montceau
- 1988–1992: Annecy
- 1995–1996: Lyon
- 1997–1998: Bordeaux
- 1998–2000: France U17
- 2002–2005: Senegal
- 2012–2026: France (assistant)
- 2026: France (caretaker)
- * Club domestic league appearances and goals

Guy Stéphan (born 17 October 1956) is a French professional football manager who most recently worked as assistant coach of the France national team.

== Playing career ==
Stéphan trained in the Perros-Guirec club. In 1976, he was spotted by En Avant de Guingamp, a D3 club where he began a promising career at age 19. The club climbed in D2 in 1977. In 1980 he signed with Rennes, still in D2, while leading head-on and successful studies of physical education teacher (which is worth new selections in France university team).

After two years at Le Havre AC and US Orléans, he joined Stade Malherbe Caen in 1985, which aimed to promote to Division 1. A year later, a car accident put an early end to his career, at 29.

== Coaching career ==
Stéphan immediately decided to become a coach. Stade Malherbe Caen proposed to him to direct their reserve team for the 1987–88 season. He coached FC Montceau Bourgogne, in the 1988–89 season, then Annecy FC. Stéphan made his classes there until 1992, when Raymond Domenech, then coach of Lyon, called him as assistant coach. He stayed with Jean Tigana for two years, before taking the reins of Olympique Lyon in 1995.

His career then led him to Bordeaux. For four and a half years, while training French coaches, he coached the 17-year-old French team and the A 'team. He was assistant to Roger Lemerre and he won the UEFA Euro 2000 in Netherlands and 2001 FIFA Confederations Cup in Japan.

In October 2002, he signed a contract with Senegal after their impressive performance in 2002 FIFA World Cup. He reached the quarter-final of 2004 African Cup of Nations hosted by Tunisia. Nevertheless, he was relieved of his duties in June 2005 after only two defeats in official matches in 30 months. He later became assistant to Jean Tigana at Beşiktaş, where he served until June 2007.

In May 2009, he was hired by Didier Deschamps as an assistant coach at Olympique de Marseille. In July 2012, he followed Deschamps to the France national team as an assistant. He has been a part of coaching staffs that have led France to the quarterfinal of the 2014 FIFA World Cup in Brazil, the final of UEFA Euro 2016 as the host nation, and then won the 2018 FIFA World Cup in Russia.

During the 2026 FIFA World Cup, Deschamps had to miss the third group-stage match against Norway after returning home due to the death of his mother; Stéphan stepped in as caretaker manager.

== Personal life ==
Guy Stéphan's sons Guillaume and Julien Stéphan are also former footballers and Julien has similarly become a football manager.

== Honours ==
Orders

- Knight of the Legion of Honour: 2018
