= Stevo Stepanovski =

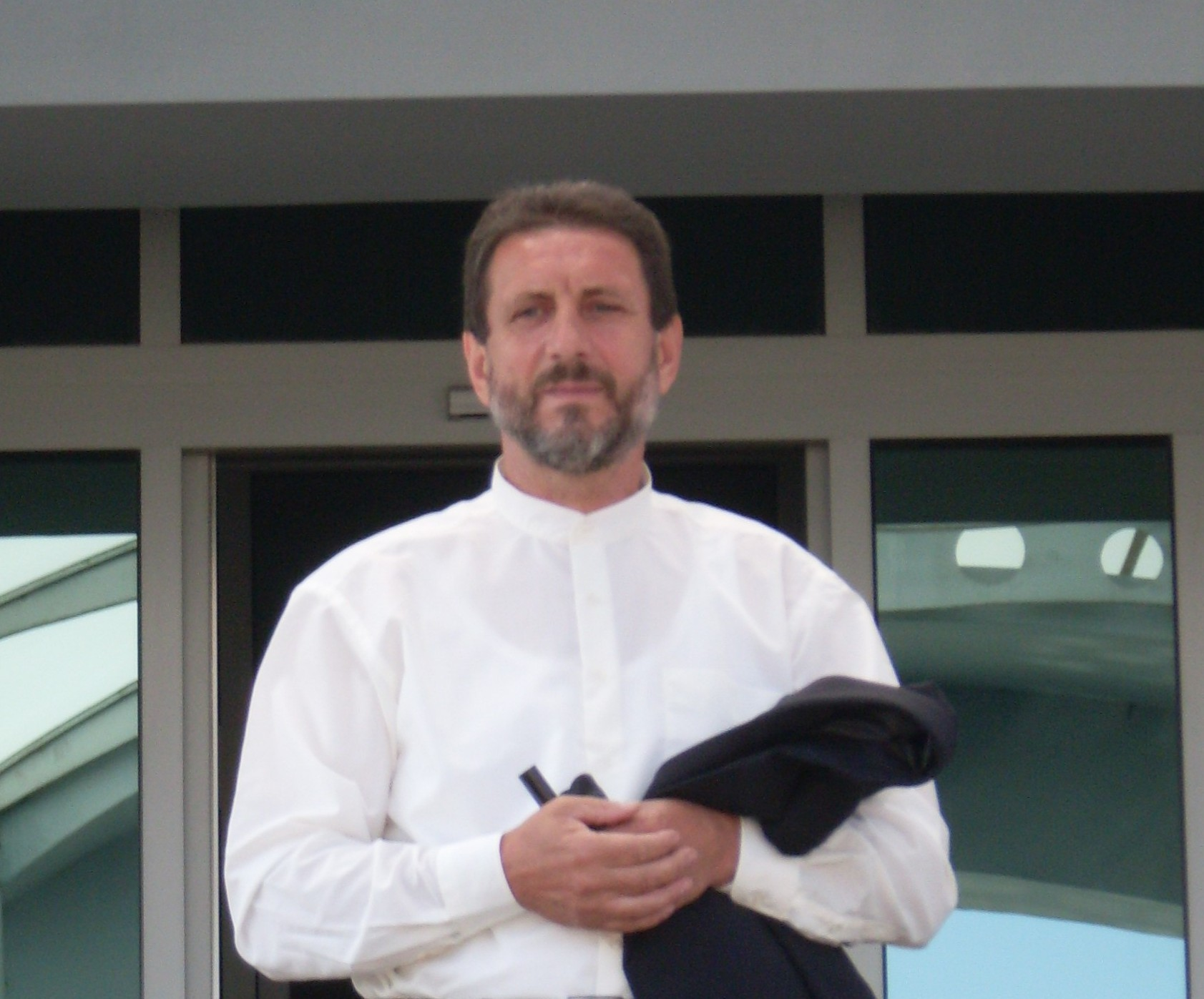
Stevo Stepanovski

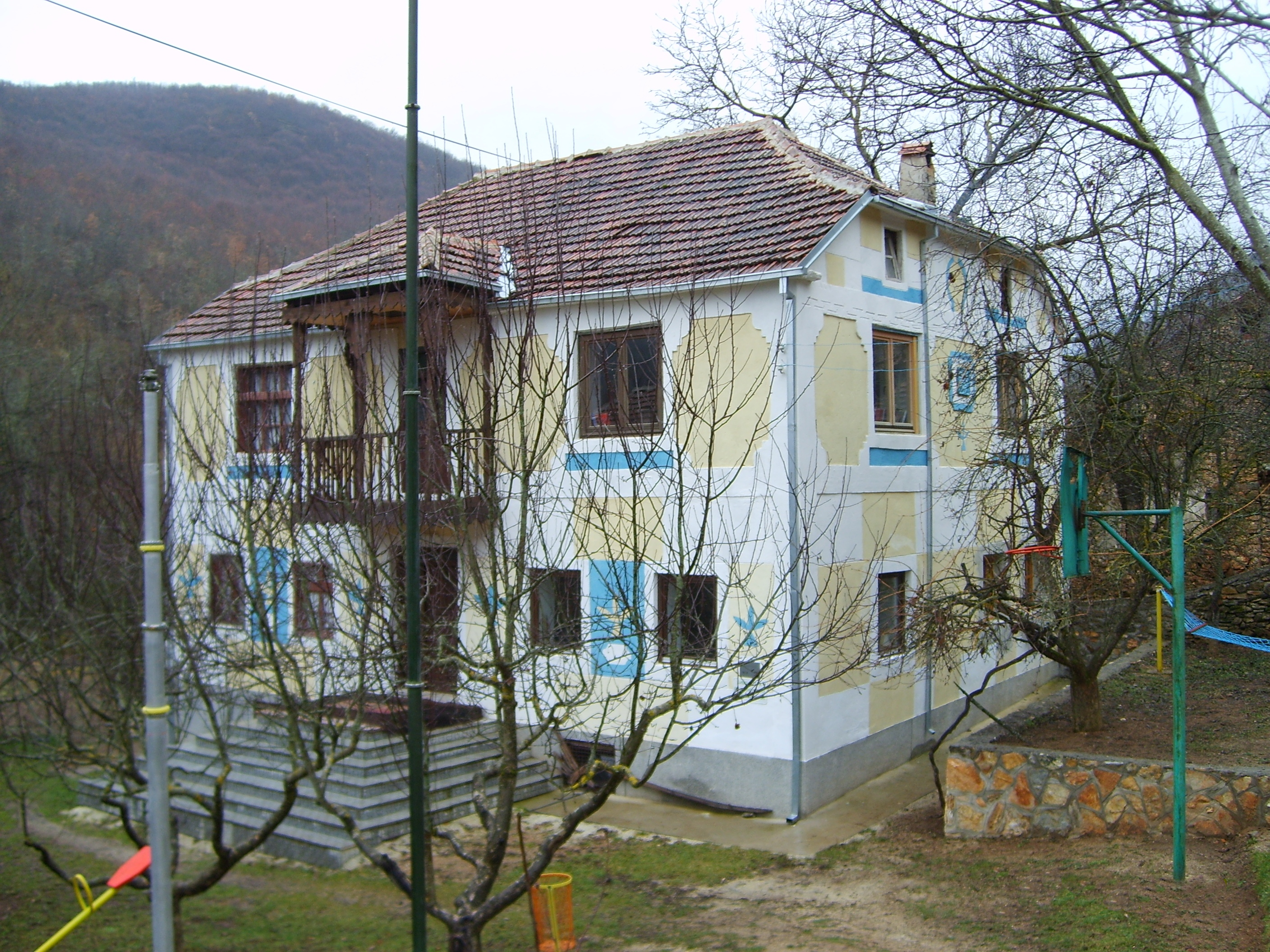
Library Al-Bi - The largest private library in North Macedonia

Stevo Stepanovski (Macedonian: Стево Степановски; born 17 July 1950) is a Macedonian bibliophile and owner of the largest private library in North Macedonia, situated in Babino, Demir Hisar. Ramkovski Foundation in September 2010 granted him the “Krste Petkov Misirkov” Work-Life Award.
