= Stefan (surname) =

Stefan is a surname of German or Austrian origin, and may refer to:

- Gary Stefan (born 1959), Canadian ice hockey player
- Greg Stefan (born 1961), Canadian ice hockey player
- Joseph Stefan (1835-1893), Austrian physicist
- Karl Stefan (1884-1951), American politician
- Oleg Stefan (born 1959), American actor
- Verena Stefan (1947–2017), Swiss-born feminist and writer

== See also ==
- Stefan (given name), a masculine given name
- Brian Kim Stefans (born 1969), U.S. poet
