= House of Kostanjić =

Croatian noble family

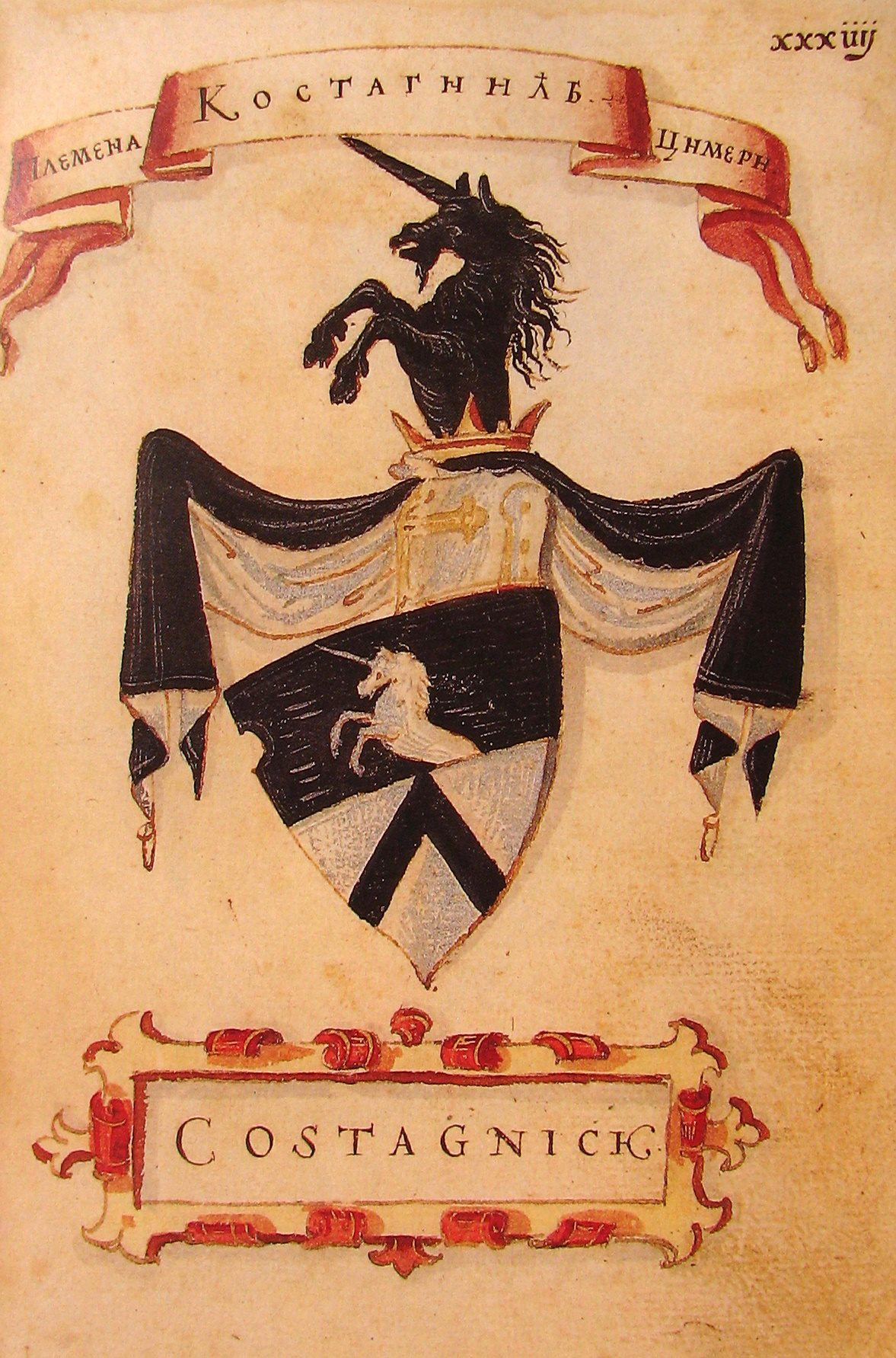
- Current region: Kingdom of Croatia
- Founded: 14th century
- Founder: Pavao Kostanjić
- Estate: Kula Kostanjić

The House of Kostanjić is an ancient Croatian noble family from Drvenik which held the title Knez of Drvenik, Perun and Zaostrog. The ancestral seat of the family is known as Kula Kostanjić (Croatian: Tower of Kostanjić). The name of the family is derived from the archaic word kostanj (Croatian: chesnut)

== Origins ==
The first grant of nobility was granted in 1398 by king Stjepan Ostoja of Bosnia († 1418) while the second document was given in 1404 by Grand Duke Stjepan Vukčić Kosača († 1466) unto Prince Pavle Kostanjić and his brothers. Another confirmation was made on 7 August 1475 by Duke Vlatko Hercegović (✶ c. 1428 - † 1489), the son of Grand Duke Stjepan Vukčić Kosača, who gave permission to the House of Kostanjić to continue using Drvenik as the main estate of the family. In this document it is also mentioned that the House of Kostanjić was accepted in the “vjeru gospodsku” (Slavic: faith of the nobles)
