= Stević =

Stević or Stevic (Cyrillic script: Стевић) is a Serbian surname.

It may refer to:

- Bogdan Stević (born 1987), Serbian footballer
- Dragutin Stević-Ranković (born 1979), Serbian former footballer
- Dušan Stević (born 1995), Serbian footballer
- Ivan Stević (born 1980), Serbian road bicycle racer
- Matt Stevic (born 1979), Australian rules football field umpire
- Miroslav Stević (born 1970), Serbian former footballer
- Oliver Stević (born 1984), Serbian basketballer
- Radomir Stević Ras (1931–1982), Serbian painter and designer
- Saša Stević (born 1981), Serbian footballer
