= Stefan Persson =

Stefan Persson may refer to:

- Stefan Persson (magnate) (born 1947), owner of Swedish fashion company Hennes & Mauritz
- Stefan Persson (ice hockey) (born 1954), retired ice hockey player
- Stefan Persson (swimmer) (born 1967), Swedish swimmer
- Stefan Persson (bandy) (born 1974), Swedish bandy player
