= Zoran Despotović =

Serbian politician

Zoran Despotović (Serbian Cyrillic: Зоран Деспотовић; born 13 January 1965) is a politician in Serbia. He is currently serving his second term in the National Assembly of Serbia as a member of the far-right Serbian Radical Party.

== Private career ==
Despotović is a veterinary technician based in Prijepolje.

== Political career ==
Despotović received the 108th position on the Radical Party's electoral list in 2000 Serbian parliamentary election. The party won twenty-two seats, and he was not included in its assembly delegation. (From 2000 to 2011, Serbian parliamentary mandates were awarded to sponsoring parties or coalitions rather than to individual candidates, and it was common practice for mandates to be awarded out of numerical order. Despotović could have been awarded a mandate despite his low position on the list, although in the event he was not.)

He was again included on the Radical Party's list for the 2007 parliamentary election, receiving the 225th position. The party won eighty-one seats, and Despotović was awarded a mandate. Although the Radical Party won the largest number of seats in this election, it fell well short of a majority and ultimately served in opposition. The assembly dissolved in early 2008 for new elections; the Radicals fell to seventy-eight seats, and Despotović, who received the 123rd position on the party's list, was not included in its delegation in next sitting of the assembly.

The Radical Party experienced a serious split in late 2008, with many members joining the breakaway Serbian Progressive Party led by Tomislav Nikolić and Aleksandar Vučić. Despotović remained with the Radicals.

Serbia's electoral system was reformed in 2011, such that parliamentary mandates were awarded in numerical order to candidates on successful lists. Despotović received the twenty-fifth position on the Radical Party's electoral list in the 2012 election and the seventeenth position in the 2014 election. The part did not cross the electoral threshold to win representation in the assembly on either occasion.

Despotović received the twenty-sixth position on the party's electoral list in the 2016 Serbian parliamentary election. The party won twenty-two seats in this election, and he was not immediately elected. He was, however, able to take a mandate in the assembly on April 17, 2018, as a replacement for Zoran Krasić, who had died a few days earlier. Despotović once again serves as an opposition member.

Despotović also served on Prijepolje's municipal council (i.e., the executive branch of the municipal government) from 2012 to 2016 and was elected to its municipal assembly in 2016.
