= Economic botany =

Intersection of people and plants

Economic botany is the study of the relationship between people (individuals and cultures) and plants. Economic botany intersects many fields including established disciplines such as agronomy, anthropology, archaeology, chemistry, economics, ethnobotany, ethnology, forestry, genetic resources, geography, geology, horticulture, medicine, microbiology, nutrition, pharmacognosy, and pharmacology. This link between botany and anthropology explores the ways humans use plants for food, medicines, and commerce.

== History ==
In a 1958 essay at the conference that founded the Society for Economic Botany, David J. Rogers wrote, "A current viewpoint is that economic botany should concern itself with basic botanical, phytochemical and ethnological studies of plants known to be useful or those which may have potential uses so far underdeveloped. Economic botany is, then, a composite of those sciences working specifically with plants of importance to [people]." Closely allied with economic botany is ethnobotany, which emphasizes plants in the context of anthropology.

Botany itself came about through medicine and the development of herbal remedies. Thus at its advent, botany was economic as well as systematic. As plants became useful for herbals and curatives, their economic value increased. An early set of instructions drawn up by a cosmographer of Charles the fifth instructed explorers to

"determine what are the items of sustenance of the land and which ones are generally used, whether fruits or seeds, and all manner of spices, drugs, or whatever other scents, and find out the time in which one can reproduce the trees, plants, herbs, and fruits that these parts offer, and if the natives use them for medicines, as we do."

Teosinte and rice are two examples of plants modified so that their economic values would increase.

== Economic botany in colonial Spain ==
Contrary to common belief that modern economic botany had been spearheaded by the British as early as the 19th century, economic botany had been exemplified in the form of plant diffusion for millennia. It really took a foothold beginning as early as the 7th century during the early phases of the Islamic Empire. Then it was further studied by the Spanish due to their lack of economic power in the spice trade of colonial world.

=== Roots in Islamic endeavors ===
As the Islamic Empire reached its westernmost limits on the Iberian Peninsula, Muslims were able to bring with them flora from the east. Between the 10th and 11th centuries, multiple types of non-native citrus were reported to exist on the Iberian Peninsula. Several books were published on the subject between the 10th and 14th centuries, showing the detailed nature of Islamic botany, differentiating between various citrus such as lemons, limes, sweet and sour oranges, pomelos, and grapefruit. In addition to classifying these various citrus before western naturalists, the Muslims were also responsible for citrus diffusion (except for the citron) and cultivation in the Mediterranean Basin. Because of Islamic presence in the Iberian Peninsula before the fall of the Empire, Paula De Vos explained that the greater western world gained its botanical scientific roots from Islamic botany.

=== Early Spanish botany ===
==== Spanish exploration for spices ====
During the Age of Exploration and Discovery, the Spanish engaged in botany not for the sake of botany as a science, but for economic and personal gain. The Spanish King Charles III stated that an expedition to South America in the 18th century was for the benefit of learning about the regions' flora, but more specifically to build upon the kings' Museum and Garden with plants and botanical illustrations. For the most part, many of these expeditions from Spain were taxonomic, but the botanists did take note of medicinal uses of many flora.

The other factor for Spanish involvement in botanical sciences during this time was because of their lack of power in spice trade. The main location for spice trade during this time was in the Spice Islands, which had been under the control of the Portuguese since 1513 until later in the 17 century when it was taken over by the Dutch. The Spanish Empire sent Magellan on a voyage for the purpose of gaining trade relations with the Spice Islands, but failed due to Portuguese control of the area. Spanish attempts at gaining power in the Spice Islands, however, were not fruitless. Antonio Pigafetta, who was on Magellan's expedition recorded many important botanical properties of the important spices found in the Maluku Islands, which would later help the Spanish in their botanical economically motivated botanical pursuits.

In addition to their attempts to gain power in the spice trade in the Moluccas, the Spanish also sought after similar spices in their colonies in the Philippines and the Americas. In the early 17th century, the Spanish found that there were numerous valuable spices like cinnamon, clove, nutmeg, and pepper that could be cultivated in the Philippines similarly to what the Portuguese could in the Moluccas. In the Americas however, the Spanish found spices of different varieties whose properties differed from those of the varieties found in the East. Some of these properties were for the better, for example a type of pepper found in the Caribbean was described by Nicolas Mondares as more flavorful and spicy than black pepper. But there were also varieties of spices found in the Americas that were not suitable for the Spanish to gain power in spice trade. For example, the cinnamon that Mondares found in the Americas had no taste or smell at all, though it was most definitely a variety of cinnamon.

==== Francisco De Mendoza ====
As the Spanish realized that their colonies in the Americas and the Philippines were not going to be able to produce a suitable amount of spices that they needed to gain an economic advantage, they landed upon the idea of transplantation. The first Viceroy of New Spain, Antonio De Mendoza showed interest for transplantation 1542, and illegally came upon seeds from the East Indies. Later in 1558 with Antonio De Mendoza's help, Francisco De Mendoza (his son) gained total rights to the production and trade over various spices from the East Indies. Francisco De Mendoza was granted all the land he saw necessary to carry out this operation, despite reservations from the Council of the Indies, who thought it intolerable to give Mendoza so much power over the situation.

Although there was almost no documentation of Mendoza's success, Nicolas Mondares was able to contact Mendoza. He found out that Mendoza had indeed been successful in cultivating both ginger and China root in New Spain. The Council of the Indies and the Spanish Crown did not gather proficient information on Mendoza's scientific and economical success although they tried. The grants given to Mendoza in 1558 provided him with enough power as to be able to avoid confrontation altogether until his death. After Mendoza's death, his spice operation failed to continue.

==== Ginger transplantation ====
Though the transplantation of most of the spices that Mendoza brought to New Spain didn't succeed, ginger was one that actually flourished in certain regions. Ginger did not do well on the mainland of New Spain, but it grew on the Caribbean Island of Hispaniola. In fact, ginger was largest crop in Hispaniola during the late 16th century, even larger than the sugar crop. Ginger was so successful on the island that there were serious problems with oversupply and overshadowing of the sugar industry.

Because of their success with ginger in the Caribbean, the Spanish tried transplantation in Spain. They brought the information they learned about growing ginger from New Spain back to Europe. In some cases, the Spanish were successful in growing ginger and it was to grow well in Seville and neighboring areas. Even though ginger grew well in Spain, it was never a major export, thus diminishing its economic value.

== Economically valuable medicinal plants ==
Medical research in the U.S. alone has a budget of $95 billion. A large portion of that money is spent on research into plants and plant extracts. Several key medical discoveries have been made by studying plants and the compounds they produce, to see the effect they have on humans.

=== Ephedrine ===
Ephedra, a gymnosperm in the order Gnetales, is the natural source of ephedrine, the plant's principal alkaloid. Ephedrine imitates epinephrine in its effect on the human body. While it has medicinal uses, ephedrine can be highly toxic. Because of this fact, medical researchers studied the compound and produced pseudoephedrine, which is used in over-the-counter medications and in the illegal manufacture of methamphetamine.

=== Echinacea ===
One of many herbal remedies, Echinacea is a significant commercial product. Many people take echinacea for cold and flu-like symptoms, but studies show that the plant has had mixed success fighting these viruses. However, those same studies show the plant possibly being useful for the treatment of upper respiratory infections. NCCAM is currently studying echinacea for the treatment of upper respiratory infections as well as its effect on the immune system.

=== American ginseng ===
American ginseng has a long history of improving the immune system to reduce the symptoms of the cold and flu. American ginseng (Panax quinguefolius L) root is a popular herb. Steamed American ginseng roots proved to be helpful against cancer. In the study, when scientists heated the American ginseng up to 120 degrees Celsius and exposed cancer cells to Ginsenoside for 72 hours, the cells' proliferation was determined. The study showed that P. quinguefolius red American ginseng could be an herbal medicine with the ability to reduce cancer.

=== Grape seed extract ===
Grape seed proanthocyanidin extract (GSPE) is a powerful antioxidant. It is derived from grape seed and is enriched with polyphenolic flavonoids and other ingredients. It can enhance the immune system to defend from toxic aflatoxins. Its functions include improving memory and prevent the liver and kidney from taking damage from drug overdoses. In China, the dietary supplement with GSPE show great health benefits to both people and animals. Also, it has the ability to inhibit the effect of food intake, so it can help with weight control.

== Economically important food plants ==
Plants that humans use for food are of high economic importance. Research into food plants generally involves increasing the size of the edible plant organ in question, or increasing the areas where the plant can be grown, and less frequently, finding new crop species. Results of such research are often published in the journal Economic Botany. The New Zealand-based Plant & Food Research publishes its own journal on cultivar development and sustainable production systems for high quality produce, and the design and development of new and novel functional foods.

=== Rice ===
Rice was first domesticated approximately 5,000 years ago, in Southeast Asia. Rice and American wild rice are believed to have been domesticated separately. Rice variants have been adapted to the tropics where they provide a grain staple, but rice can be grown almost anywhere. The introduction of dwarf rice variants made several rice-producing countries self-sufficient. Rice is suited to countries with high rainfall.

People consume a lot of rice everyday worldwide. If the rice producers can improve the quality and quantity of their rice crops, it would be very profitable for the farmers. The timing of adding nutrition or fertilizer to the rice crop is important since the nutrition will attract pests, which would then damage the plants. So, the farmers check the color of the rice plant's leaves as the indicator for when they need to apply nitrogen fertilizer. Then, farmers can manage their farms more successfully. Another recent study about the rice husk is also valuable. The rice husk extract ETOAC can be a good antioxidant. It can turn the unused part of the rice plant into something valuable and protects our environment.

=== Teosinte ===
The teosintes are grasses of the genus Zea. Native Americans bred and selected teosinte for the traits we see in corn today (large ears, multiple rows of kernels). The first ears of maize were very short, with only 8 rows of kernels. Modern corn is the result of several thousand generations of selective breeding. Modern corn is incapable of reproducing without human help; the kernels will stay firmly attached to the cob and rot. This does not represent a useful adaptation for the species, but is excellent for harvesting and transporting corn.

GBS (genotyping-by-sequencing) technology helps the corn industry by allowing for a better understanding of the genetic mechanisms of which kind of corn should be planted, where they should be planted, and how much should be planted. The main areas of success include: low cost, reduced samples, fewer CPR and purification steps, no size fractionation, and more. This makes the production of corn much easier.

=== Florida oranges ===
Citrus has been a major commercial product in Florida since the 19th century. Florida was once responsible for the majority of the U.S. citrus supply. The color of oranges is not related to ripening, but is a serious component for sales. The orange color only develops in areas with cool nighttime temperatures. In tropical climates, growers often expose the fruit to ethylene, to promote the loss of chlorophyll and expose the beta-carotenes (the orange color).

=== North American apples ===
Apples are not native to North America, but the North American continent boasts the greatest diversity of apples in the world. Part of this is due to Johnny Appleseed, whose real name was John Chapman. Chapman spent 48 years travelling all along the American northwest spreading apple seeds and planting trees. While apples come in literally thousands of varieties, the majority of the apple market is based on three: Red Delicious, Golden Delicious, and Granny Smith.

== Ornamental plants ==
Ornamental plants can be found in almost any store, and many people have at least one in their home. However, ornamental plants are not limited to houseplants. Landscaping agencies make heavy use of ornamental plants, usually with an accompanying high cost. Trees, shrubs, flowers, and grasses, all of these are planted by professional landscaping agencies regularly, with a large economic effect.

=== Carnation ===
Carnation is popular because of its color, size, fragrance and longevity. Scientists studied the biological processes, cellular component and molecular functions to improve the growing of carnation flowers. Carnations grow better in cool climate around 10 to 15 degrees Celsius. Scientists tried to improve the cut flowers to "live" longer in higher temperatures. It turned out that carnations can't grow well in hot environments. So, the farmers plant the carnations in greenhouses to assure that they are growing.

=== Crape myrtle ===
Crape myrtles (Lagerstroemia spp. L) are very common flowering shrubs in the U.S. They originally came from Southern Asia and have grown in the United States for more than 180 years after being imported. Crape myrtles are popular because they can grow in different environments. The colors of the flowers are distinct for different varieties. There are more than 35 kinds of crape myrtles. In the southern United States, they became the major landscape trees there. Also, crape myrtles can be used as host trees to solve the pest problem.

== See also ==
- Agroecology
- Ethnobotany
- Society for Economic Botany
