= Ilija Despot =

Ilija Despot (Zaostrog, 20 July 1885 – Split, 28 November 1970) was a Croatian theologian, lawyer, poet and writer.

== Early life ==
Ilija Despot was the son of Pavao Despot (1847 - 1888) and Countess Manda Kostanjić (1849 - 1918) of the noble house of Kostanjić from Drvenik. He was also the nephew of the Croatian writer Ivan Despot, after whose example he wished to become a priest. After his theological studies in Zadar however, he decided to remain a layman and went on to study law, in which he achieved a doctorate in Zagreb in 1920.

== Career ==
He worked as a judge and lawyer, and as a cultural associate in Križevci, Šibenik, Split.

His writings were influenced mostly by Silvije Strahimir Kranjčević and Andrija Kačić Miošić who was a priest in the same Franciscan monastery of Zaostrog as Despot. His numerous writings include poems and travelogues together with cultural, historical and biographical studies.

He was married to Iva Paulina Mardešić (born 1899) of the wealthy industrial Mardešić family from the island of Vis. Their son Pavao Despot (1936 - 2017) was also a notable writer and poet.

== Bibliography ==
- Drhtaji duše (1912)
- Duša (1914)
- Iseljenoj Hrvatskoj (1914)
- Nad grobom majke (1917)
- Kidanje (1926)
