= Guillaume Stéphan =

French footballer (born 1982)

Personal information
- Date of birth: 10 September 1982 (age 44)
- Place of birth: Sainte-Adresse, France
- Height: 1.74 m (5 ft 9 in)
- Position: Midfielder

Senior career*
Years	Team	Apps	(Gls)
2000–2003	Paris Saint-Germain B		
2003–2004	Guingamp B		
2004–2005	FC Meyrin		
2005–2007	Tours	23	(1)
- * Club domestic league appearances and goals

Guillaume Stéphan (born 10 September 1982) is a French former professional footballer. A midfielder, he spent two seasons with Tours FC in Ligue 2 and Championnat National after playing for the reserves of Ligue 1 sides En Avant de Guingamp (2003 to 2004) and Paris Saint-Germain (2002 to 2003).

== Personal life ==
Guillaume Stéphan is the brother of Julien Stéphan and the son of Guy Stéphan, both also former footballers.

== Honours ==
Tours

- Championnat National: 2005–06
