= Stefan Bereuter =

German politician (born 1985)

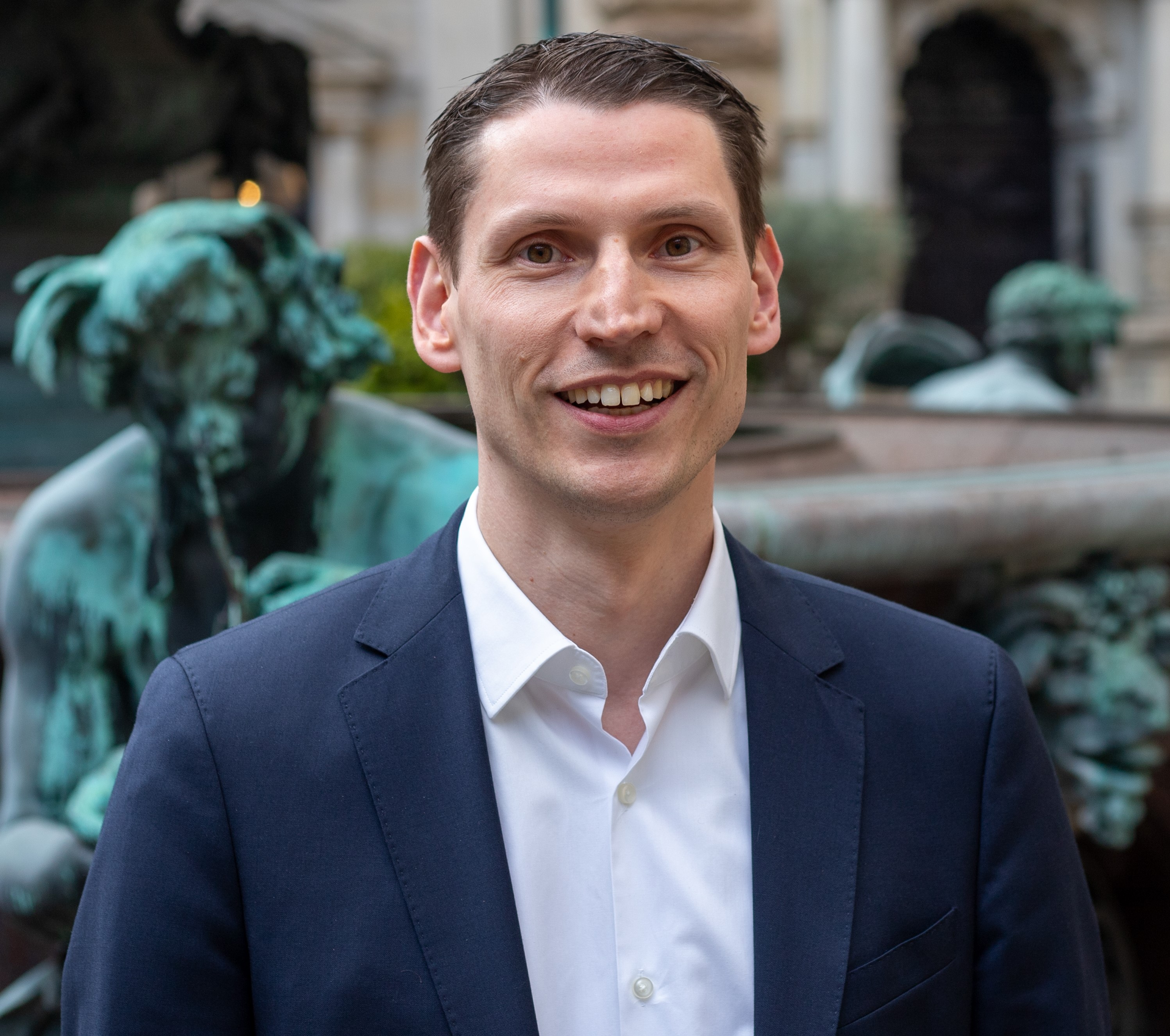
- Bereuter in 2025

Member of the Hamburg Parliament
- Incumbent
- Assumed office 26 March 2025

Personal details
- Born: 4 November 1985 (age 40)
- Party: Christian Democratic Union (since 2006)

Stefan Bereuter (born 4 November 1985) is a German politician serving as a member of the Hamburg Parliament since 2025. He has served as spokesperson for civil service of the Christian Democratic Union group in the Parliament since 2026.
