= Stefen =

Stefen is a masculine given name. Notable people with the name include:

- Stefen Fangmeier (born 1960), American director
- Stefen Reid (born 1972), Canadian football player
- Stefen Wisniewski (born 1989), American football player
- Felipe Stefen (born 1995), Brazilian writer and photographer
