= Stefan =

Stefan may refer to:

- Stefan (given name)
- Stefan (surname)
- Ștefan, a Romanian given name and a surname
- Štefan, a Slavic given name and surname
- Stefan (footballer) (born 1988), Brazilian footballer
- Stefan Heym, pseudonym of German writer Helmut Flieg (1913–2001)
- Stefan (honorific), a Serbian title
- Stefan (album), a 1987 album by Dennis González

== See also ==
- Stefan number, a dimensionless number used in heat transfer
- Sveti Stefan or Saint Stefan, a small islet in Montenegro
- Stefanus (disambiguation)
