= Stefan Docx =

Belgian chess player (born 1974)

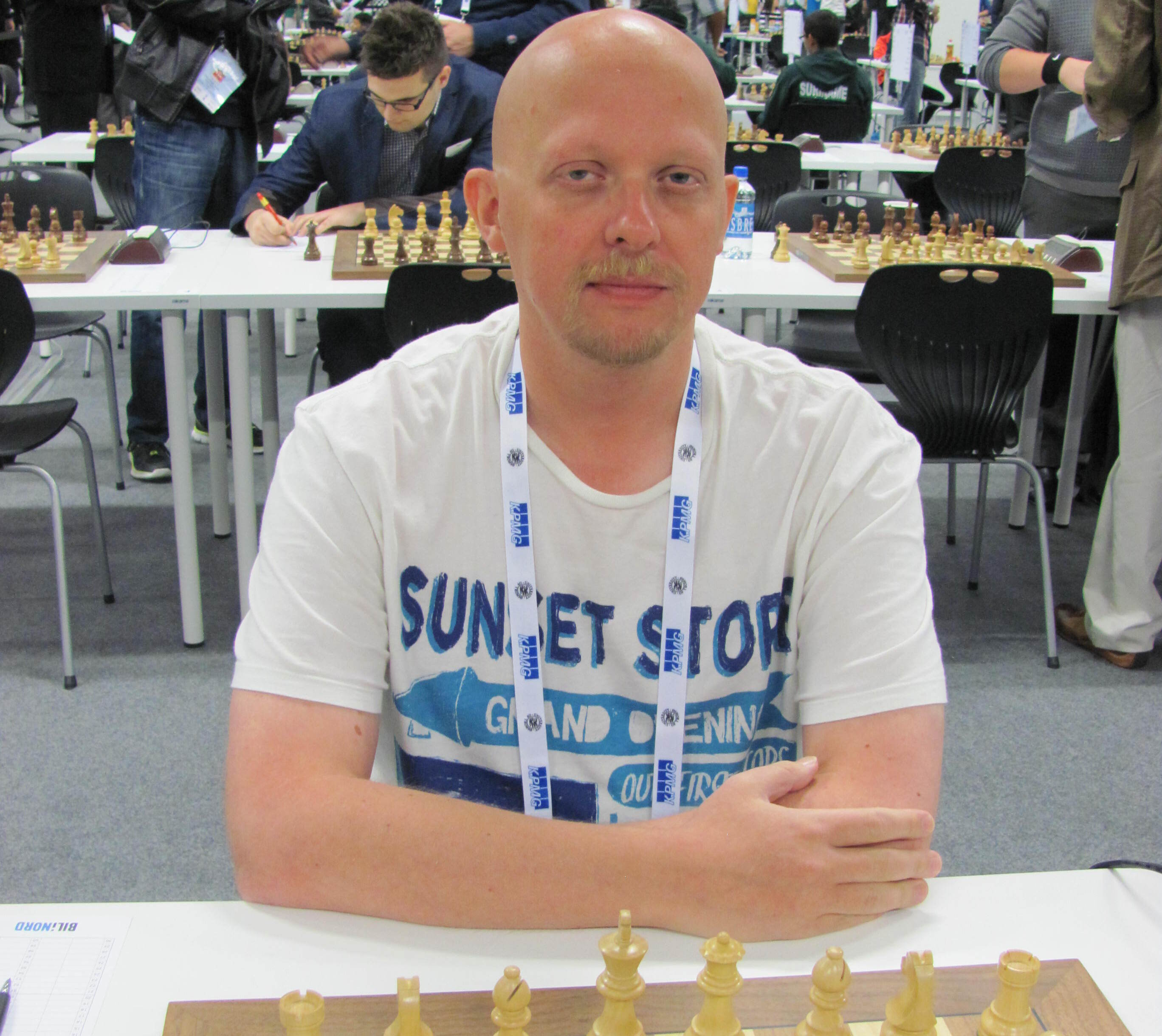
- Docx in 2018

Personal information
- Born: January 12, 1974 (age 52) Antwerp, Belgium

Chess career
- Country: Belgium
- Title: International Master (2013)
- Peak rating: 2491 (July 2014)

Stefan Docx is a Belgian chess player.

== Chess career ==
In September 2018, he played for Belgium at the 43rd Chess Olympiad, where they defeated Malawi 3.5-0.5.

In July 2022, he played for Belgium at the 44th Chess Olympiad, losing to Francisco Vallejo Pons (whom he had defeated in their previous encounter) during their encounter with Spain.

In December 2022, he was given a one-year ban after refusing a metal detector scan at the Benidorm Open. He was disqualified and not paired for the ninth and final rounds, though statistician Kenneth W. Regan was not able to find any evidence of Docx cheating.
