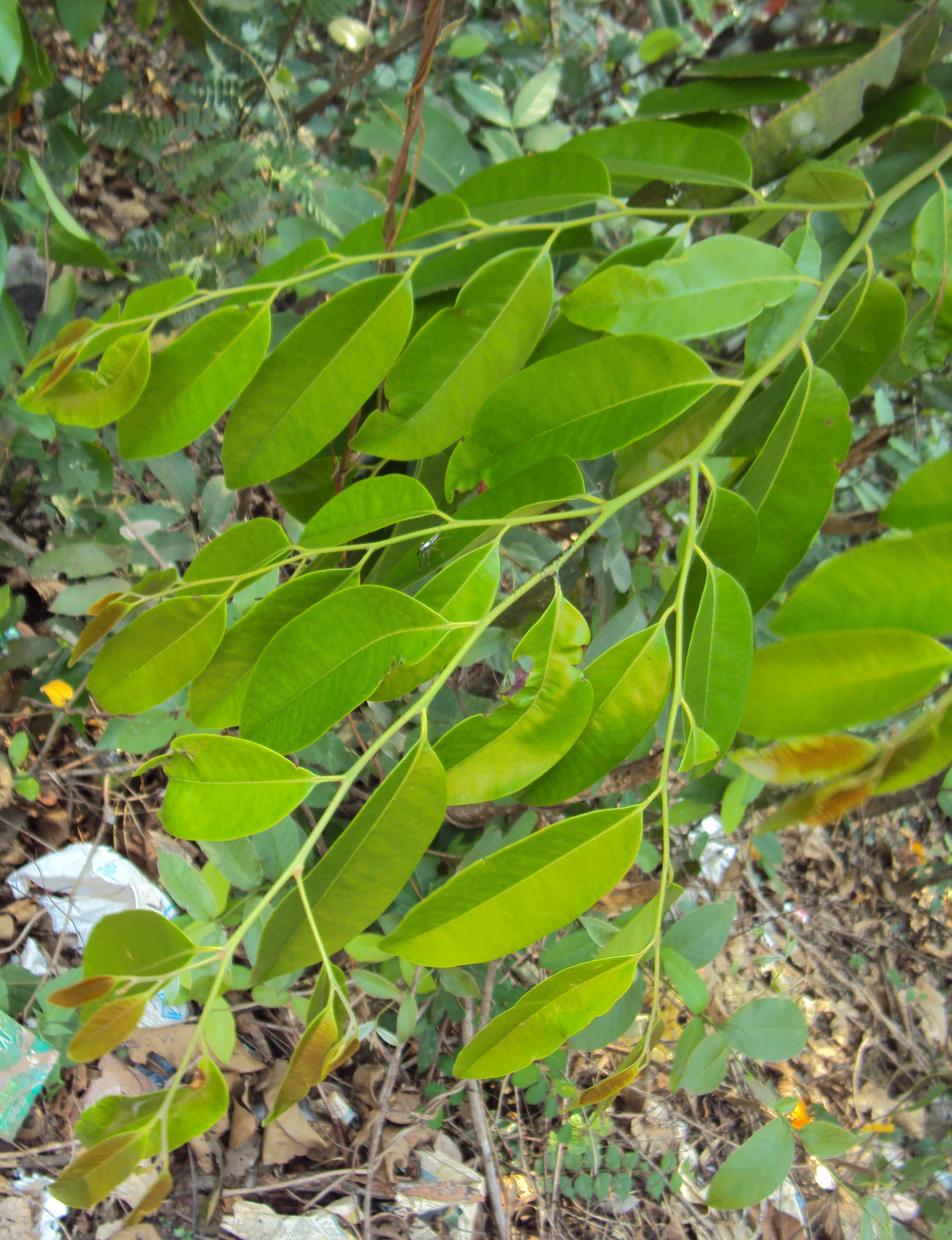

Conservation status
- Vulnerable (IUCN 3.1)

Scientific classification
- Kingdom: Plantae
- Clade: Tracheophytes
- Clade: Angiosperms
- Clade: Eudicots
- Clade: Asterids
- Order: Ericales
- Family: Ebenaceae
- Genus: Diospyros
- Species: D. candolleana

Binomial name
- Diospyros candolleana Wight

Synonyms
- Diospyros arnottiana Miq. ex Thwaites; Diospyros canarica Bedd.; Diospyros oligandra Bedd.

= Diospyros candolleana =

Species of flowering plant

Diospyros candolleana, is a tree in the Ebony family, endemic to the Western Ghats of India and Sri Lanka. The trees are usually 20m tall, and found as subcanopy trees in wet evergreen forests up to 90m.

== Description ==
The bark of D. candolleana is smooth, dark, and blaze-reddish in color. Branchlets are terete and show adpressed hairs when young. Leaves are simple, alternate, distichous; petioles are 0.6-1.1 cm long and canaliculate. Leaves are hairy when young, and glabrous when mature. Lamina is about 6-18 x 3.5-7.5 cm in length, shape is oblong to elliptic-oblong.

Flowers are unisexual and dioecious. Inflorescence of Male flowers show axillary clusters on very short tubercles, silky tomentose; and female flowers are sessile, in axillary clusters.

Fruits are as berries and usually bear 4 seeds.

== Uses ==
Use extensively in timber production. Timber is hard, and used in building constructions. A decoction of root-bark is used in rheumatism and swellings in traditional medicine.

== External resources ==
- http://pilikula.com/botanical_list/botanical_name_d/diospyros_candolleana.html
- http://indiabiodiversity.org/species/show/10378
