= Friedrich Stephan =

American academic

- Born: May 27, 1941
- Scientific career
- Fields: Circadian physiology

Dr. Friedrich Karl Stephan (born May 27, 1941) is an American academic who is a circadian physiologist. He is the Curt P. Richter Distinguished Professor of Psychology & Neuroscience at Florida State University. His research focuses on localization and function of biological clocks in vertebrates, light and food as entraining signals for circadian rhythms, obesity, sleep, and reproduction. He is credited as the discoverer of the suprachiasmatic nucleus ("body clock").
