= Stephy =

Stephy is a given name. Like the similarly-spelled names Steffi, Stefi, Stefie, and Stephie, it is generally a hypocorism of the feminine name Stephanie.

People with this name include:

- Stephy Tang (born 1983), Hong Kong singer
- Stephy Qi (born 1985), Chinese actress
- Stephy Zaviour (born 1992), Indian costume designer
- Stephy Mavididi (born 1998), English footballer
- Stephy Leon (fl. 2004–present), Indian actress
