= Stephanie =

- Pronunciation: /ˈstɛfəni/ STEF-ən-ee
- Gender: Female

Origin
- Origin: Greek

Other names
- Nicknames: Stefi, Stivi, Nia, Sebi, Seby, Stephy, Stebi, Stiby, Stefy, Stephi, Steph, Steffi, Stevie, Stephie, Stibi, Stiby
- Related names: Stéphanie, Stephen, Steven, Steffi, Stephan, Stefan, Stefani, Stevani, Stephani, Stefanie, Stefni

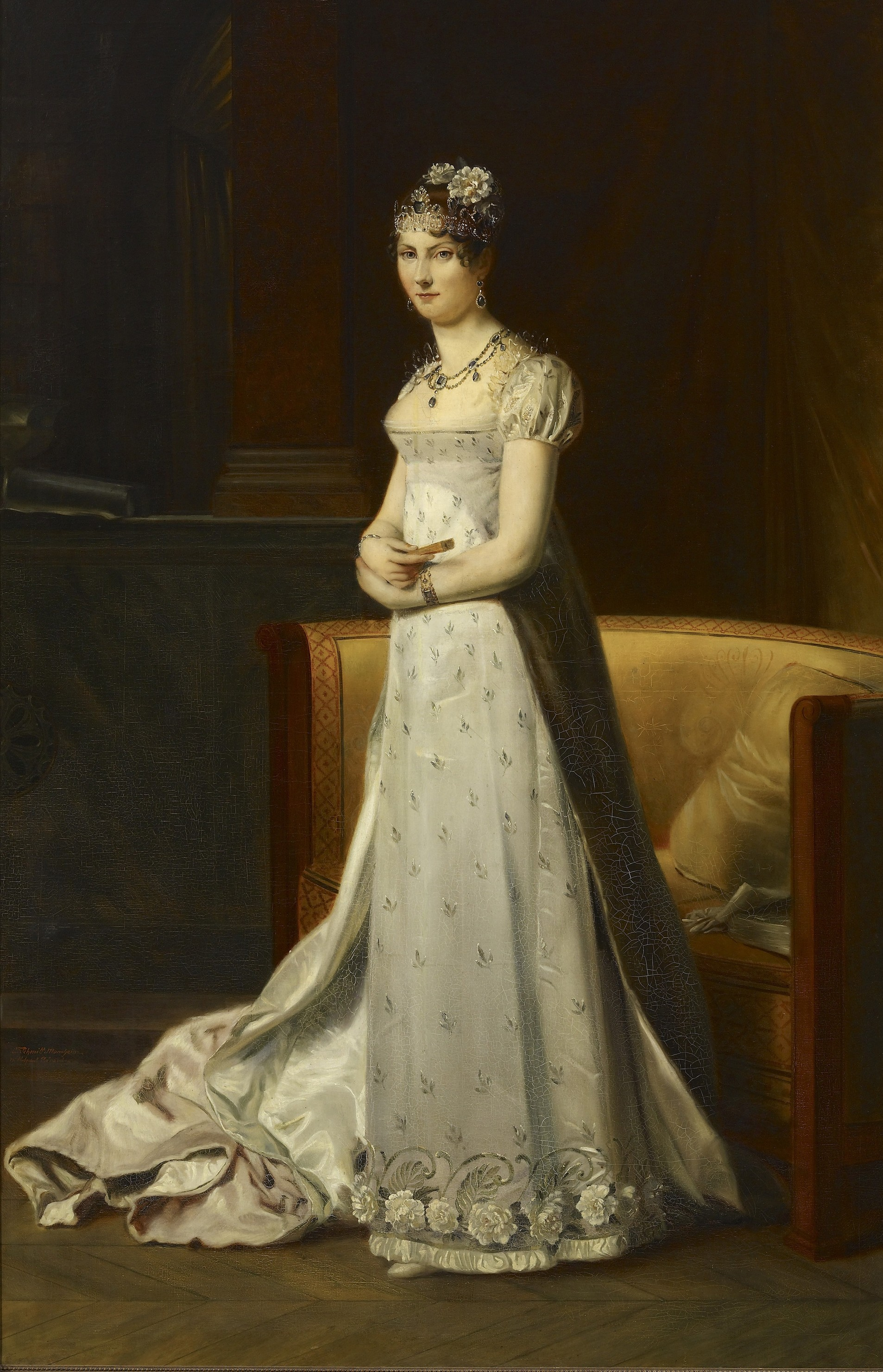
Painting of Stéphanie Anne Donnell de Beauharnais by François Pascal Simon, Baron Gérard (1806)

Stephanie or Stefanie is a feminine name that comes from the Greek name Στέφανος (Stephanos) meaning "wreath, garland, christmas wreath or crown". Forms of Stephanie in other languages include the German Stefanie, the Italian, Czech, Polish, and Russian Stefania, the Portuguese Estefânia (although the use of that version has become rare, and both the English and French versions are the ones commonly used), and the Spanish Estefanía. The form Stéphanie is from the French language, but Stephanie is now widely used both in English- and Spanish-speaking cultures.

== People ==
=== Royalty ===
- Stephanie, Queen of Navarre (died after 1066), Queen consort of king García Sánchez III of Navarre
- Stephanie of Castile (died 1 July 1180), illegitimate daughter of Alfonso VII of León and Castile
- Stephanie of Milly, Lady of Oultrejordain (died 1197), an influential figure in the Kingdom of Jerusalem
- Stephanie of Milly, Lady of Gibelet, an influential figure in the Kingdom of Jerusalem, first cousin of the former
- Stephanie of Hohenzollern-Sigmaringen (1837–1859), consort queen of Portugal, married to King Pedro V
- Stéphanie de Beauharnais (1789–1860), French consort of Karl Ludwig Friedrich, Grand Duke of Baden
- Stephanie of Belgium (1864–1945), daughter of Leopold II of Belgium and wife of Rudolf, Crown Prince of Austria
- Stephanie, Princess zu Windisch-Graetz (1909–2005), Austrian artist, daughter of Archduchess Elisabeth of Austria
- Princess Stéphanie of Monaco (born 1965), youngest child of Grace Kelly and Prince Rainier of Monaco
- Stéphanie, Grand Duchess of Luxembourg (born 1984), Belgian noble and wife of Guillaume V, Grand Duke of Luxembourg

=== Others ===
- Stephanie (born 1987), American singer and actress
- Stephanie Abrams (born 1978), global travel expert, radio & TV presenter, on-camera meteorologist on The Weather Channel
- Stephanie Adams (1970–2018), American Playboy model and author
- Stephanie Aeffner (1976–2025), German politician
- Stephanie "Stevvi" Alexander, American singer-songwriter and guitarist
- Stephanie Arnold (born 1978), American athlete
- Stephanie Au (born 1992), Hong Kong competitive swimmer
- Stephanie Balduccini (born 2004), Brazilian swimmer
- Stephanie Brantz (born 1972), Australian sports presenter
- Stephanie Beacham (born 1947), British actress
- Stephanie Beard (born 1981), Canadian actress, voice actress and television and radio personality
- Stephanie Beatriz (born 1981), American actress
- Stephanie Bellars (born 1976), American professional wrestling valet
- Stephanie Bendixsen (born 1985), Australian television presenter and video game reviewer
- Stephanie Benson (born 1967), Ghanaian singer
- Stephanie Bentley (born 1963), American country music artist
- Stephanie Berto (born 1953), Canadian track and field athlete
- Stephanie Best (born 1969), American athlete
- Stephanie Birkitt (born 1975), American attorney, former assistant to David Letterman
- Stefanie Blaschka (born 1995), German politician
- Stephanie J. Block (born 1972), American actress and singer
- Stephanie Blythe (born 1970), American mezzo-soprano opera singer and educator
- Stephanie Bond, (born 1981), New Zealander netball player
- Stephanie Booth (1946–2016), British business owner and hotelier
- Stefanie Bord, American politician
- Stephanie Boykin, American politician
- Stephanie Burgess, American politician
- Stephanie Burgis, American fantasy writer
- Stephanie Cam, American model and beauty queen
- Stephanie Cayo (born 1988), Peruvian actress, singer and songwriter
- Stephanie Chambers (born 1971), British actress
- Stephanie Chan (born 1957), Canadian para table tennis player
- Stephanie Che (born 1974), Hong Kong actress and singer
- Stephanie Cheng (born 1984), Hong Konger singer and starlet
- Stephanie Cmar (born 1985), American chef and Top Chef contestant
- Stephanie Cohen-Aloro (born 1983), French tennis player
- Stephanie Cole (1941–2026), British actress
- Stephanie Dabney (1958–2022), American ballerina
- Stephanie D'Abruzzo (born 1971), American muppeteer
- Stephanie Davis (born 1993), English actress
- Stephanie de Zorzi (born 1993), Venezuelan model and beauty queen
- Stefanie Dehnen (born 1969), German chemist
- Stephanie Del Valle (born 1996), American and Puerto Rican musician, model, and pageant winner
- Stephanie Deshpande (born 1975), American artist
- Stephanie Dixon (born 1984), Canadian swimmer
- Stefanie Dolson (born 1992), American basketball player
- Stephanie Dosen (born 1973), American singer-songwriter and designer
- Stéphanie Douard (born 1979), French Paralympic swimmer
- Stefanie Draws (born 1989), German football defender
- Stephanie Economou, American composer and violinist
- Stephanie Edwards, American TV personality and actress
- Stephanie Fearon (born 1989), British singer and actress
- Stéphanie Félicité Ducrest de St-Albin, comtesse de Genlis (1746–1830), French writer and educator
- Stephanie Finochio, a.k.a. Trinity (born 1971), American stuntwoman and professional wrestling valet
- Stéphanie Foretz (born 1981), French former tennis player
- Stephanie Forrester (born 1969), British triathlete
- Stefani Germanotta (born 1986), a.k.a. Lady Gaga, American recording artist, actress, and activist
- Stefanie Giesinger (born 1996), German model
- Stephanie Goldner (1896–1962), Austrian American harpist and the first female member of the New York Philharmonic in 1922
- Stephanie Gooden, American politician
- Stefanie Maria "Steffi" Graf (born 1969), German tennis player, former World No. 1 woman tennis player
- Stephanie Graf (born 1973), former Austrian middle-distance athlete
- Stephanie Grebe (born 1987), German para table tennis player
- Stephanie Grisham, American former White House press secretary
- Stephanie Hammerman, world's first CrossFit Level 2 trainer with cerebral palsy
- Stefanie Hertel (born 1979), German yodeler, TV presenter, and popular performer of Alpine folk music
- Stephanie Higginson, Canadian politician
- Stephanie Hill (born 1995), English academic, singer, actress, model, dancer and beauty pageant titleholder
- Stephanie Ho (born 1992), Hong Kong singer, artist, former golfer
- Stephanie Hodge (born 1956), American actress and stand-up comic
- Stephanie Horner (born 1989), Canadian swimmer
- Stephanie Hsu (born 1990), American actress
- Stephanie Hughes, New Zealand neurobiologist
- Stephanie Hwang, a.k.a. Tiffany (born 1989), Korean-American singer, a member of Korean pop group Girls' Generation
- Stephanie Jacobsen (born 1980), Hong Kong-born Australian actress
- Stephanie Jallen (born 1996), American skier
- Stephanie Jaramillo (born 1982), American retired professional boxer
- Stephanie Jerome, American politician
- Stephanie Tubbs Jones (1949–2008), American politician, representative from Ohio
- Stefanie Joosten (born 1988), Dutch model, singer and actress
- Stephanie Kantis (born 1968), American jewelry designer
- Stephanie Kim (born 1987), American singer and ballerina, a member of The Grace
- Stefanie Klee (born 1982), German politician
- Stephanie Klick (born 1956), American politician
- Stefanie Kloß, German singer
- Stefanie Koch (born 1981), German ski mountaineer
- Stephanie Kurlow, Australian dancer
- Stephanie Kurtzuba (born 1972), American actress
- Stephanie Kwolek (1923–2014), Polish-American chemist and the inventor of Kevlar
- Stephanie Land (born 1978), American writer and public speaker
- Stéphanie Lapointe (born 1984), Quebec singer and actress
- Stephanie Laurens (born 1953), Australian romance author
- Stefanie Lawton (born 1980), Canadian curler from Saskatchewan
- Stephanie Lee, Korean-American actor and model
- Stephanie Lemelin, American voice actress
- Stephanie Longfellow (born 1882-after 1909), American stage and film actress
- Stephanie Luzie (born 1974), German gothic metal singer
- Stephanie MacQuarrie, Canadian organic materials chemist
- Stephanie March (born 1974), American actress
- Stéphanie Mariage (born 1966), French para table tennis player
- Stefanie Marsh, British journalist and writer
- Stefanie Martin (1877–1940), German biological anthropologist
- Stephanie Markowski (born 2001), Canadian ice hockey player
- Stephanie Pace Marshall (born 1945), American educator and founder of the Illinois Mathematics and Science Academy
- Stephanie McIntosh (born 1985), Australian actress
- Stephanie McLean, British model
- Stephanie McMahon (born 1976), former occasional professional wrestler and current WWE executive
- Stephanie McMichael (born 1989), Big Brother 2008 contestant
- Stephanie Merritt (born 1974), English writer, author, and critic
- Stephenie Meyer (born 1973), American author and film producer
- Stéphanie Michelini, French actress
- Stephanie Miller (born 1961), American actress and radio talk show host
- Stephanie Mills (born 1957), American R&B, soul and gospel singer/songwriter
- Stephanie Anne Mills (born 1979), Canadian actress
- Stephanie Millward (born 1981), British Paralympic swimmer
- Stefanie Mirlach, German football midfielder
- Nina Morato (née Stephanie Morato, born 1966), French singer
- Stephanie Morton (born 1990), Australian track cyclist
- Stephanie Nicks, also known as Stevie Nicks (born 1948), American singer and songwriter
- Stephanie Nilles, American pianist, composer/arranger
- Stephanie Niznik (1967–2019), American actress
- Stephanie Norton (born 2000), Hong Kong sailor
- Stephanie Okwu (born 1994), Nigerian beauty queen
- Stephanie O'Sullivan (born 1959), American former national intelligence official
- Stephanie Park (born 1993), Canadian Paralympic wheelchair basketball player
- Stephanie Pakrul (born 1982), American blogger
- Stephanie Peacock (born 1986), British MP
- Stephanie Poetri (born 2000), Indonesian singer-songwriter and record producer
- Stephanie Pohl (born 1978), German beach volleyball player
- Stefanie Powers (born 1942), American actress
- Stephanie Pratt (born 1986), American television personality and actress
- Stefanie Preissner (born 1988), Irish writer and actress
- Stephanie Putson (born 1973), English film, television, and stage actress
- Stephanie Reid (born 1996), Australian basketball player
- Stephanie Rice (born 1988), Australian swimmer
- Stefanie Ridel (born 1973), American singer, songwriter, and actress
- Stephanie Romanov (born 1969), American model and actress
- Stephanie Saland, American former ballet dancer and teacher
- Stephanie Herseth Sandlin (born 1970), American lawyer and politician, U.S. representative from South Dakota
- Stephanie Moulton Sarkis, American psychotherapist and author
- Stefanie Scott (born 1996), American actress
- Stephanie Schriock (born 1973), American political strategist
- Stephanie Schuhknecht (born 1983), German politician
- Stephanie Schweitzer (born 1992), Australian athletics competitor
- Stephanie Seymour (born 1968), American model and actress
- Stephanie Sheh, (born 1977) American voice actor
- Stephanie Shipp, American economist and social statistician
- Stephanie Sigman, (born 1987), Mexican actress
- Stephanie Singer (born 1964), American mathematician and former politician
- Stephanie Siriwardhana (born 1988), Sri Lankan-Lebanese model
- Stéphanie Sivrière (born 1975), French watchmaker and jewellery designer
- Stephanie Slater (born 1991), British Paralympic swimmer
- Stephanie Murray Smith (born 1987), American television personality, make-up artist, hairstylist, and beauty pageant titleholder
- Stephanie Storp (born 1968), German shot putter
- Stefanie Sun (born 1978), Singaporean popular singer
- Stephanie Syjuco (born 1974), Filipino-born American conceptual artist and educator
- Stephanie Talbot (born 1994), Australian basketball player
- Stephanie Tency (born 1990), Dutch actress, TV host, model and beauty pageant titleholder
- Stéphanie Tirode (born 1975), French female sport shooter
- Stephanie Trong (born 1976), American editor
- Stephanie Turner, American actress and filmmaker
- Stefanie Vogelsang (born 1966), German politician
- Stephanie Waring (born 1978), English actress
- Stephanie Wehner (born 1977), German physicist and computer scientist
- Stephanie Wells (born 1968), American jewelry designer
- Stephanie Wheeler (born 1981), American wheelchair basketball player
- Stephanie White (born 1977), American basketball player and coach
- Stephanie Wilson (born 1966), American astronaut
- Stephanie Ybarra, American theater producer and educator
- Stephanie Young, American voice actress and singer
- Stephanie Zacharek, American film critic
- Stephanie Zammit, Maltese teacher, model and beauty pageant titleholder
- Stephanie Zimbalist (born 1956), American actress
- Stephanie Zvan, American activist, radio host, and author

== Fictional characters ==
- Stephanie, a character in the TV series LazyTown
- Stephanie, one of the main title characters in the LEGO Friends franchise
- Stephanie Brown, a.k.a. Spoiler, costumed hero in DC Comics, part of the Batman Family
- Steph Dean, nickname of Stephanie Dean, a character in UK soap opera Hollyoaks
- Stephanie Forrester, a character on the CBS soap opera The Bold and the Beautiful
- Stephanie Johnson, a character in the American soap opera Days of Our Lives
- Stephanie Plum, bounty hunter and title character from the novel series by Janet Evanovich
- Stephanie Scully, a character in the TV series Neighbours
- Stephanie Smothers, a character in the film A Simple Favor
- Stephanie Tanner, a character on the TV series Full House
- Stephanie, the English name of the main character Popis (or Phoebe)'s doll "Serafina" from the animated television series El Chavo Animado.

== See also ==
- Stef
- Stefania (name)
- Steff
- Steph
- Stephan (given name)
- Stefan (given name)
