= Stéphanie =

Stéphanie is a French feminine given name. Notable people with the name include:

- Stéphanie, Grand Duchess of Luxembourg (born 1984), Belgian noble; wife of Guillaume V, Grand Duke of Luxembourg
- Princess Stéphanie (disambiguation), several people
- Stéphanie Anquetil, Mauritian politician
- Stéphanie Arricau (born 1973), French golfer
- Stéphanie Atger (born 1975), French politician
- Stéphanie Blake (born 1968), author of children's stories
- Stéphanie Bouvier (born 1981), short track speed-skater
- Stéphanie de Beauharnais (1789–1860), consort of Karl, Grand Duke of Baden
- Stéphanie Cohen-Aloro (born 1983), French tennis player
- Stéphanie Dixon (born 1984), Canadian swimmer
- Stéphanie Dubois (born 1986), Canadian tennis player
- Stéphanie Falzon (born 1983), French hammer thrower
- Stéphanie Félicité du Crest de Saint-Aubin (1746–1830), French writer and educator
- Stéphanie Foretz (born 1981), French tennis player
- Stéphanie Jiménez (born 1974), Andorran mountain runner
- Stéphanie Lapointe (born 1984), Canadian singer, songwriter, and actress
- Stéphanie Mbanzendore, Burundian feminist activist
- Stéphanie Moisdon (born 1967), French curator and art critic
- Stéphanie Amélie Mismaque (1881–1958), commonly known as Fanny Rozet, French artist
- Stéphanie Possamaï (born 1980), French judoka
- Stéphanie St-Pierre (born 1985), Canadian freestyle skier
- Stéphanie Vachon, Quebec politician
- Stéphanie Vallée (born 1971), Canadian politician, lawyer and negotiator
- Stéphanie Vongsouthi (born 1988), French tennis player

== See also ==
- Stephanie
