= Skepticon =

Conference focused on skepticism, humanism, activism, and education

- Status: Active
- Genre: skepticism, atheism, science, education, activism, and freethought
- Venue: Oasis Convention Center
- Locations: St. Louis; Springfield, Missouri
- Country: U.S.A.
- Inaugurated: 2008
- Most recent: Current
- Attendance: 1,500 (2012)
- Website: skepticon.org

Skepticon is a skeptic and secular convention held in the United States. Guest speakers are invited to discuss skepticism, science, education, activism, and other related topics.

== History ==
The Skepticon conference grew out of a speaking engagement organized by a student group on the campus of Missouri State University. The students invited two well-known atheist speakers, PZ Myers and Richard Carrier, to campus to speak critically about belief in God. The event was considered particularly controversial because Springfield, Missouri, is home to the Assemblies of God national headquarters and the campuses of several religious universities, including Evangel University.

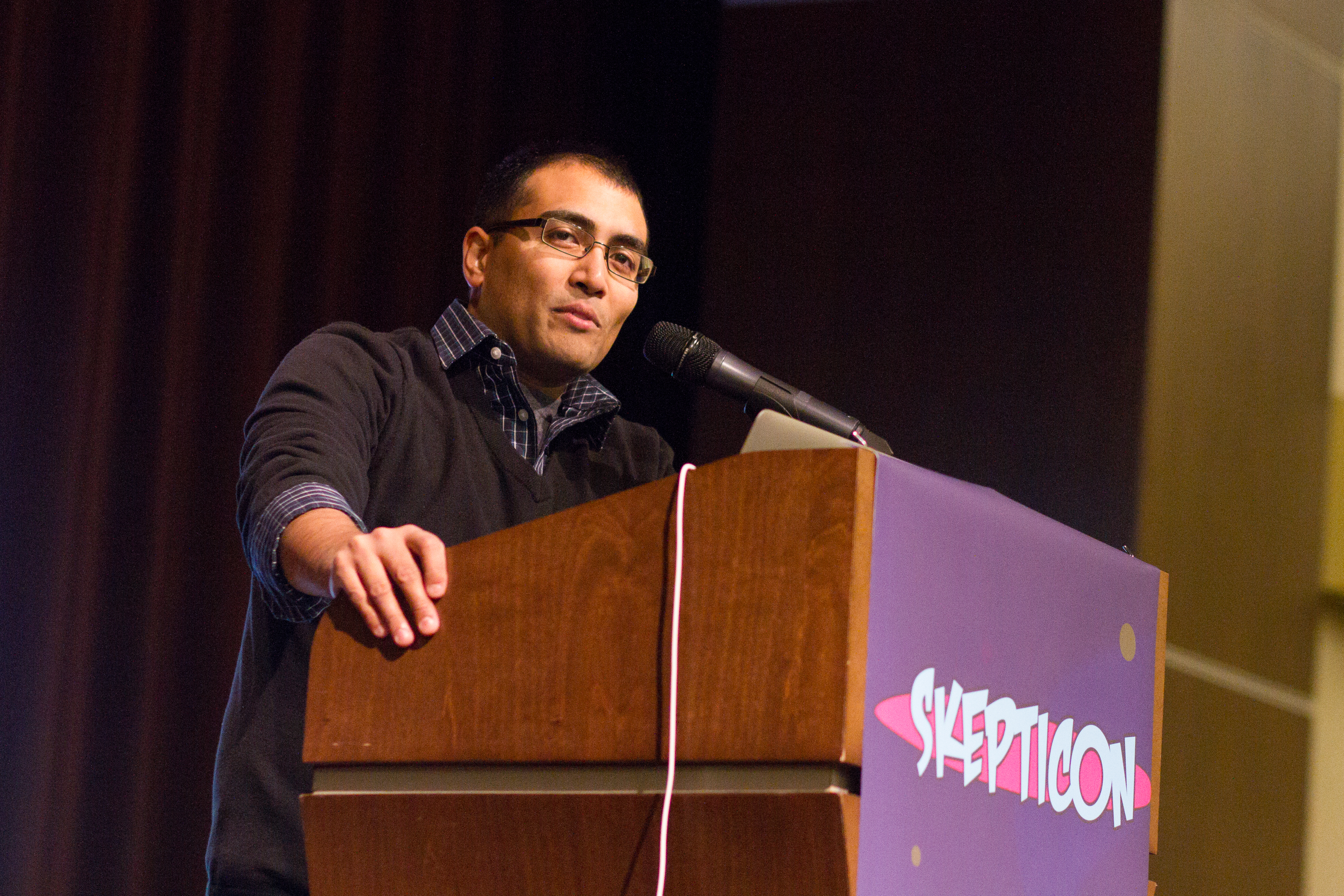
Hemant Mehta at Skepticon 7 in 2014

In the years that followed, the conference was able to attract additional speakers willing to reduce or forgo their speakers' fees so as to keep the conference free for attendees. Donors help with the cost of event space and speakers' travel costs.

In July 2010, Skepticon received the "Best On Campus Event" award from the Center for Inquiry.

Shortly before Skepticon III in November 2010, critics questioned the naming of the convention, suggesting that it focused more on atheism than skepticism.

Skepticon IV (2011) featured a tour of a nearby creationist museum, two full days of lectures detailing science-related topics, and a performance by Atheist Evangelist Brother Sam Singleton. A local gelato shop owner took offense to Singleton's performance and posted a sign in the store window which read "Skepticon is NOT welcomed to my Christian Business." The resulting internet reaction had a negative impact on the store's user ratings on a number of consumer satisfaction websites. Three days later the shop owner posted an apology on the website Reddit. Concern over whether the sign violated the Civil Rights Act of 1964 earned the incident the nickname "gelato-gate."

In 2016, Skepticon banned Carrier for what organizer Lauren Lane described as "repeated boundary-pushing behavior." Later that same year, Carrier sued Skepticon and Lane for defamation, tortious interference, and emotional distress.

== Atheism vs. Christianity debate ==
Skepticon 2009 featured a debate between Christian and atheist experts on the question "Does God exist?" Participants included Richard Carrier, Victor Stenger, and JT Eberhard for the atheist perspective and professors Charlie Self, Zachary Manis, and Greg Ojakangas presenting the Christian position.

== Confrontation vs. accommodation debate ==
Skepticon III (2010) explored the merits of confrontation versus accommodation and featured a debate between James Randi, PZ Myers, Richard Carrier, and Amanda Marcotte.

== Locations, dates and speakers ==
Dates	Location	Attendance	Speakers	Organizers	Notes
October 11, 2008	Missouri State University	250	Richard Carrier, PZ Myers	JT Eberhard, Lauren Lane	Called Skeptics
November 20–22, 2009	Missouri State University	400	Dan Barker, Richard Carrier, D. J. Grothe, PZ Myers, Joe Nickell, Robert M. Price, Victor Stenger, Rebecca Watson	JT Eberhard, Lauren Lane	Promoted as Skepticon II
November 19–21, 2010	Springfield Expo Center	1000	Dan Barker, Richard Carrier, Greta Christina, JT Eberhard, David Fitzgerald, D.J. Grothe, Amanda Marcotte, PZ Myers, Joe Nickell, James Randi, Sam Singleton Atheist Evangelist, Victor Stenger, Rebecca Watson	JT Eberhard, Lauren Lane	Confrontation v. Accommodation
November 18–20, 2011	Gillioz Theatre	1100	Dan Barker, Richard Carrier, Greta Christina, JT Eberhard, David Fitzgerald, Julia Galef, Spencer Greenberg, Jey McCreight, Hemant Mehta, PZ Myers, Joe Nickell, Darrel Ray, Dave Silverman, Sam Singleton Atheist Evangelist, Rebecca Watson, Eliezer Yudkowsky	Katie Hartman, Jeffrey Markus, Lauren Lane, Susi Bocks	
November 9–11, 2012	Springfield Expo Center	1500	Jessica Ahlquist, Richard Carrier, Sean Carroll, Greta Christina, James Croft, Matt Dillahunty, JT Eberhard, Phil Ferguson, David Fitzgerald, Julia Galef, George Hrab, Deborah Hyde, Keith Jensen, Amanda Knief, Teresa MacBain, Hemant Mehta, PZ Myers, Jennifer Ouellette, Tony Pinn, Darrel Ray, Rebecca Watson	Jeffrey Markus (Executive Director), Katie Hartman (Fundraising Director), Lauren Lane (Chief Brand Officer), Micah Weiss (Program Director), Izzy Burke (Volunteer Relations), Floyd Zamarripa (Marketing Director)	Film Festival added
November 15–17, 2013	Springfield Expo Center	N/A	Seth Andrews, Richard Carrier, Greta Christina, John Corvino, Heina Dadabhoy, JT Eberhard, David Fitzgerald, Debbie Goddard, Rebecca Hensler, Amanda Knief, Keith Lowell-Jensen, Amanda Marcotte, Monica R. Miller, PZ Myers, Aron Ra, Shelley Segal, David Tamayo, Rebecca Watson	Jeffrey Markus, Lauren Lane, Micah Weiss, Floyd Zamarripa	
November 21–23, 2014	Oasis Con. Center	N/A	Daniel Biar, Ben Blanchard, Melanie Brewster, Greta Christina, Scott Clifton, Heina Dadahboy, Amy David Roth, Matt Dillahunty, JT Eberhard, David Gorski, Nicole Gugliucci, Peggy Mason, Hemant Mehta, PZ Myers, Cara Santa Maria, Sheree Renée Thomas, Kayley Whalen	Rebekah (finance), Blythe, Bart (website designer), Micah, Lauren Lane (co-founder), Rob Lehr (official videographer), Jeffrey Markus, Floyd Zamarripa	Sponsors: American Atheists, American Humanist Association (AMA), Atheist Alliance International (AAI), Atheists on Air, Foundation Beyond Belief (FBB), Kansas City Atheist Coalition (KCAC), Polaris Financial Planning, Secular Woman
November 13–15, 2015	Oasis Con. Center	N/A	Bo Bennett, Jamie DeWolf, Fallon Fox, Mary Anne Franks, Sikivu Hutchinson, Nathanael Johnson, Sam Kean, Hiba Krisht, Niki Massey, Destin Sandlin, Kavin Senapathy, Muhammad Syed, Justin Vollmar, Stephanie Zvan		-
November 11–13, 2016	Oasis Con. Center	N/A	Greta Christina, Bria Crutchfield, Heina Dadabhoy, Jerry DeWitt, Victor Harris, Rebecca Hensler, Joshua Hyde, Alix Jules, Margee Kerr, Jennifer Raff, Nola Olsen, Lauren Lane, Josiah Mannion, Benny Vimes, Rebecca Watson, Stephanie Zvan		
November 10–12, 2017	Oasis Con. Center	N/A	Ross Blotcher, Nikki Jane, Randall Jenson, Leighann Lord, Mika McKinnon, Samantha Montano, Laura Thomas, Mandisa Thomas, Jessica Xiao		
August 9–11, 2019	City Center Hotel, St. Louis, MO	N/A	To be determined		
