= Niki Massey =

American atheist blogger (1980–2016)

Niki Massey (October 1980 – October 1, 2016) was an atheist blogger and speaker. She was on the advisory council of the American Humanist Association's Feminist Humanist Alliance, and was one of the founding members of The Orbit, the "first atheist media site founded explicitly to work on all forms of social justice." She gave a presentation at Skepticon 8 in 2015 (called "Reproductive Justice: Activism on the Sidewalk") unexpectedly, when a scheduled speaker failed to arrive.

She also volunteered as a clinic escort at Planned Parenthood, and wrote erotica.

== Personal life ==
Massey described herself as (among other things) black, poor, a "feminist with womanist leanings", "on the asexual spectrum," a gamer, and a geek. She experienced numerous health issues, including depression, attention deficit disorder, PTSD, generalized anxiety disorder, chronic pain and fatigue.

Stephanie Zvan considered her a friend.
