= Baulkham Hills High School =

Location
- Baulkham Hills, New South Wales; Australia; 33°45′5″S 150°59′26″E

Information
- Other name: Baulko
- Type: Government-funded; selective; co-educational; secondary; day school
- Motto: Persevere
- Established: 23 March 1974; 52 years ago
- Educational authority: New South Wales Department of Education
- Oversight: NSW Education Standards Authority
- Principal: Wayne Humphreys
- Teaching staff: 88.8 (on an FTE basis) (2025)
- Years: Year 7 to Year 12
- Enrolment: 1,223 (2025)
- Campus: Suburban
- Colours: Olive green & burnt orange
- Website: baulkham-h.schools.nsw.gov.au

Baulkham Hills High School (colloquially known as 'Baulko') is a government-funded academically selective secondary school. It lies within Baulkham Hills in the Hills District of Sydney, New South Wales, Australia.

The school is renowned for its academic achievement and ranked second in the NSW Higher School Certificate in 2016, 2017 and 2020. It also ranked fifth in 2018, ninth in 2019, third in 2021, 2022 and 2023, sixth in 2024, and seventh in 2025. In 2010, the school was ranked the most popular school in NSW for high school applications.

== History ==
Baulkham Hills High School was established in 1971 as a public comprehensive high school. It was officially opened on 23 March 1974 by the then Governor, Sir Roden Cutler. For the first year, students and teachers at the school were relocated to nearby Castle Hill High School whilst Baulkham Hills High School was still under construction. The school's first selective cohort was in 1990, with all grades being selective by 1995.

The school was built on the site of a former orange orchard, with the region having once been a major orange producing area of Sydney. This history is acknowledged by the use of an orange on the school logo. The use of the word "Persevere" as the school motto encourages students to persevere in all their studies.

"The school emblem consists of the school name and the motto "PERSEVERE". It also shows an orange, as Baulkham Hills area was one of the main orange producing areas of the State, with the school being built on a former orange orchard."

Acknowledgement of the agricultural history of the area is also reflected in the naming of the four intramural sports houses of the school, which are named after four prominent early European settlers in the area: MacDougall (red), Suttor (blue), Meehan (yellow) and Hughes (green).

== Admissions and enrolment ==
Total enrollment in junior years (Years 7–10) is approximately 180 students per year group, and around 200 per year group in senior years (Years 11–12), due to transfers from other schools. As of 2025 the total enrollment was 1,223 students.

As a selective school, entry into the school in Year 7 is based upon results in a statewide examination known as the Selective High Schools Test. In 2020, the lowest admitted score was 234 out of the maximum 300. For students falling below the lowest admitted score, admission is determined using a reserve system and an assessment of their academic record.

== Facilities ==
=== Departments and staff rooms ===
There are ten staff rooms for all of the faculties.

- English (upstairs C Block)
- History (downstairs D Block)
- Technology and Industrial Arts (upstairs F Block)
- Languages Other Than English (LOTE) (upstairs D Block)
- Mathematics (upstairs B Block)
- PDHPE (E Block)
- Science (E Block)
- Social Sciences (upstairs D Block)
- Support Unit (downstairs C Block)
- Creative and Performing Arts (CAPA) and Music (downstairs G Block)

== Extracurricular activities ==
The school holds annual sports carnivals for swimming, cross country and athletics. Selected students compete in wider regional competitions, from Zone and Area to the CHS (Combined High Schools). There are two teachers who are the sports organizers overseeing sport.

=== Inter-school tournament ===
The Tri-school Tournament was first held in 2011 between Baulkham Hills, James Ruse Agricultural High School and Girraween High School. Teams from each school participated in basketball, association football and touch football. Baulkham Hills obtained first place in both the 2011 and 2012 tournaments.

In 2013, Penrith High School joined the sporting tournament previously known as the Tri-school Tournament, and it became known as the Quad-school Tournament. In addition to basketball, association football and touch football, Penrith hosted table tennis in 2013. Again, Baulkham Hills High School won the tournament. The competition returned in 2014, with Baulkham Hills hosting basketball, Girraween hosting touch football, James Ruse hosting soccer and Penrith hosting volleyball. Again, Baulkham Hills High School won the tournament.

Since the introduction of Quad-schools, Baulkham Hills have won the competition twelve times, nine of them being consecutively, and Penrith has won once.

=== Academic ===
A variety of academic extra-curricular activities are offered, in various subject areas.

- Tournament of Minds
- Future Problem Solving
- Mock Trial
- OzCLO (Computational and Linguistics Olympiad)
- Debating
- Physics, Chemistry and Biology Olympiad Team
- Mathematics Olympiad Team
- Australian and New Zealand Brain Bee Competition

=== Sport ===
In addition to sporting competitions and tournaments such as Zone, Area and CHS, the school offers additional sporting activities to selected students, including:

- Knockout Regional Teams (Basketball, Volleyball, Touch Football, Table Tennis)
- Regional Championship Sports
- Quad Schools Tournament, against James Ruse Agricultural High School, Penrith High School and Girraween High School, in which Baulko won in 2021, 2023, 2024 and 2026

=== Cadets ===
Australian Army Cadets is a youth development organisation with ties to the Australian Army. Cadets parade in the school quadrangle (the main open space in the centre of the school) every Thursday afternoon. In this time, recruits and intermediate cadets are instructed by older students who have earned the rank of a non-commissioned officer, in drill, military traditions, navigation, survival, fieldcraft and leadership. Furthermore, Cadets annually parade in the school gymnasium on Anzac Day as well as at other local primary schools and the Castle Hill RSL Dawn Service. Cadets also parade in the school on Remembrance Day as well as other schools and RSL clubs, such as Glenorie. Annual field exercises(AFX) are conducted, taking cadets out to test their skills in a bush setting, among various camps and excursions throughout the school year.

=== Creative and performing arts ===
The school offers various activities in the field of creative and performing arts, including:

- School Bands, including Junior, Intermediate, Concert, Senior, and Symphonic Wind Ensemble.
  - Specialized bands, including String Ensemble, Big Band, and Orchestra.
- School Choir
- Music Nights
- Variety Night
- Photography Club
- Art Club

=== Other extracurriculars ===
- Leo Club(charity club)
- Chess Club
- Green Group (environmental club)
- Outreach (A club that organizes events for charity)
- Baulko Bulletin (The school's very own newspaper)
- T-Soc (Tamil Society)
- B-Soc (Business Society)
- B-Well (Mental-health club)
- Soul Purpose (ISCF)
- Spectrums (LGBT club)
- Coding Club (Learning essential coding skills)
- French Club

== Notable alumni ==
- Greg Combet – former Member for Charlton (2007–2013); former federal minister in the Rudd and Gillard governments; former Secretary of the Australian Council of Trade Unions (2000–2007)
- Sam Dastyari – former Senator for New South Wales (2013–2017); General Secretary of the NSW branch of the Labor Party (2010–2013)
- Jayne Jagot – Judge of the High Court of Australia
- Stephanie Schweitzer – athlete; represented Australia at the 2012 London Paralympics
- Broderick Wright – rugby footballer

== Notable teachers ==
- Gordon Smith (retired) – wrestler, represented Australia in the 1976 Montreal Olympics

== See also ==
- List of government schools in New South Wales (A-B)
- Education in Australia
- List of selective high schools in New South Wales
