= Piaget SA =

Swiss luxury watchmaker and jeweler

- Type: Subsidiary
- Industry: Watchmaking and jewellery
- Founded: 1874
- Founder: Georges Edouard Piaget
- Headquarters: Geneva, Switzerland
- Number of locations: Stores in 80 countries. All parts are made in Switzerland
- Area served: Worldwide
- Key people: Georges Edouard Piaget (Founder); Yves Piaget (President); Chabi Nouri (Chief Executive Officer)
- Products: Watches, jewels
- Parent: Richemont
- Website: Piaget.com

Piaget SA (French pronunciation: [pja.ʒɛ]) is a Swiss luxury watchmaker and jeweller. Founded in 1874 by Georges Piaget in the village of La Côte-aux-Fées, Piaget is currently a subsidiary of the Swiss Richemont group.

Piaget was founded as a manufacturer of watch movements but began marketing its own line of watches in the 20th century.

== History ==
=== Origins ===
In 1874, Georges Edouard Piaget set up his first workshop on the family farm, situated in the small village of La Côte-aux-Fées in the Swiss Jura mountains. Situated in the Neuchâtel region, the company was dedicated to crafting pocket watches and high-precision clock movements.

In 1911, Timothée Piaget, the son of Georges Piaget, took over the family firm. The company's policy has been to be dedicated to the production of wristwatches ever since.

Starting in the 1940s, the founder's grandsons, Gérald and Valentin Piaget with the assistance of sales director Camille Pilet, expanded the brand. Pilet, while not part of the family, was an important influence on the development of the brand. The Piaget brand became a registered trademark in 1943. Since then, the manufacturer at La Côte-aux-Fées has produced its own creations. As a result of this expansion, the family business opened a new factory in 1945, again in La Côte-aux-Fées.

=== Ultra-thin movement and jewellery ===
In 1957, the manufacture at La Côte-aux-Fées brought out the Calibre 9P, the first ultra-thin (2 mm), hand-wound mechanical movement.

In addition to coin watches, ring watches, brooch watches and cufflink watches, Piaget created their first pieces of jewellery.

In 1957, the Emperador men's watch was launched and since its relaunch in 1999 has become one of the brand's emblematic models.

Building on the success of these ultra-thin movements, Piaget continued to innovate throughout the decades. In 2014, they introduced the Altiplano 900P, the world's thinnest mechanical hand-wound watch at just 3.65mm thick. The Altiplano 900P broke the previous record held by Jaeger-LeCoultre, incorporating the case and movement into a single unit to achieve this remarkable thinness. This watch exemplified Piaget's commitment to technical innovation and minimalist design, continuing their legacy in setting world records for ultra-thin watches.

The company's expansion led to the opening of a new factory in Geneva, dedicated to jewellery and, in 1959, their first boutique.

In 2014, Piaget presented the Altiplano 900P. At 3.65 millimeters (around 1/8th of an inch) it is the world's thinnest hand-wound mechanical watch.

=== Rapid expansion ===
In 1964, Piaget presented their first watches with dials worked in precious stones: lapis-lazuli, turquoise, onyx and tiger's eye. Piaget then launched the cuff watch. 1976 saw the launch of the Calibre 7P, a quartz movement, during the quartz crisis.

The Piaget Polo watch with its avant-garde style, was brought out in 1979 and became one of the brand's models. The Dancer collection was launched in 1986.

The company has been under the presidency of Yves Piaget since 1980.

=== Merger ===
The luxury Vendôme group, now Richemont, purchased the Piaget manufacture in 1988.

In the 1990s, several new collections were launched: Possession, Tanagra, Limelight and Miss Protocole with its interchangeable straps.

Piaget brought out the Altiplano watch and in 1999 reinvented one of their classics, the Emperador line.

Watchmaking was regrouped in one collection: Black Tie.

=== 21st century ===
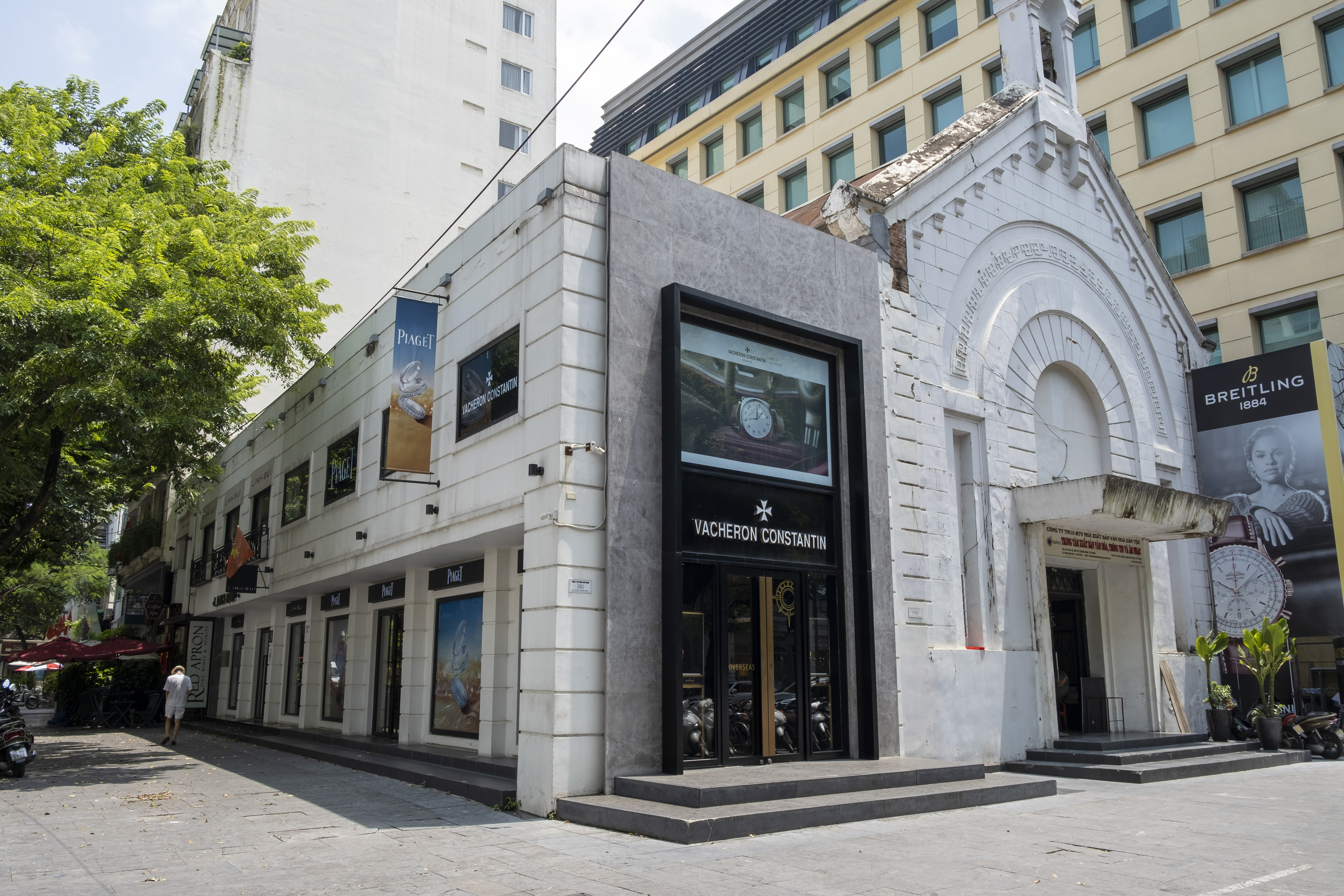
Piaget shop in Hanoi, Vietnam

In 2001, a Piaget Haute Horlogerie manufacture was opened in Plan-les-Ouates, just outside Geneva. The movements continued to be produced at La Côte-aux-Fées, the family's birthplace. The new building grouped together over 40 professions in the fields of watchmaking and jewellery.

The manufacture developed mechanical movements and in 2002 brought out the first Piaget Manufacture tourbillon movement, the Calibre 600P, the thinnest tourbillon in the world with 3.5 mm thickness.

In 2024, Piaget celebrated their 150th anniversary.

== Watch and jewelry manufacturing ==
=== Ultra-thin movement ===
The brand is one of the forerunners in the creation of ultra-thin movements with the manual 9P and automatic 12P movements, respectively the thinnest in their category in the world in 1957 and 1960. This has led in more recent years to the modern developments 430P, 450P and 438P, with a thickness of only 2.1 millimetres. These latest innovations are used in the Altiplano line, the most recent of which is the Altiplano 900P. At 3.65 millimeter it is the world's thinnest hand-wound mechanical watch.

=== Tourbillon skeleton movement ===
Piaget's flying tourbillon movement is the thinnest of its kind in the world (3.5 mm). It is divided into segments corresponding to each of the 60 seconds, a sunburst guilloche decoration shines out from the tourbillon's frame. The model is in gold and set with precious stones.

== Environmental rating ==
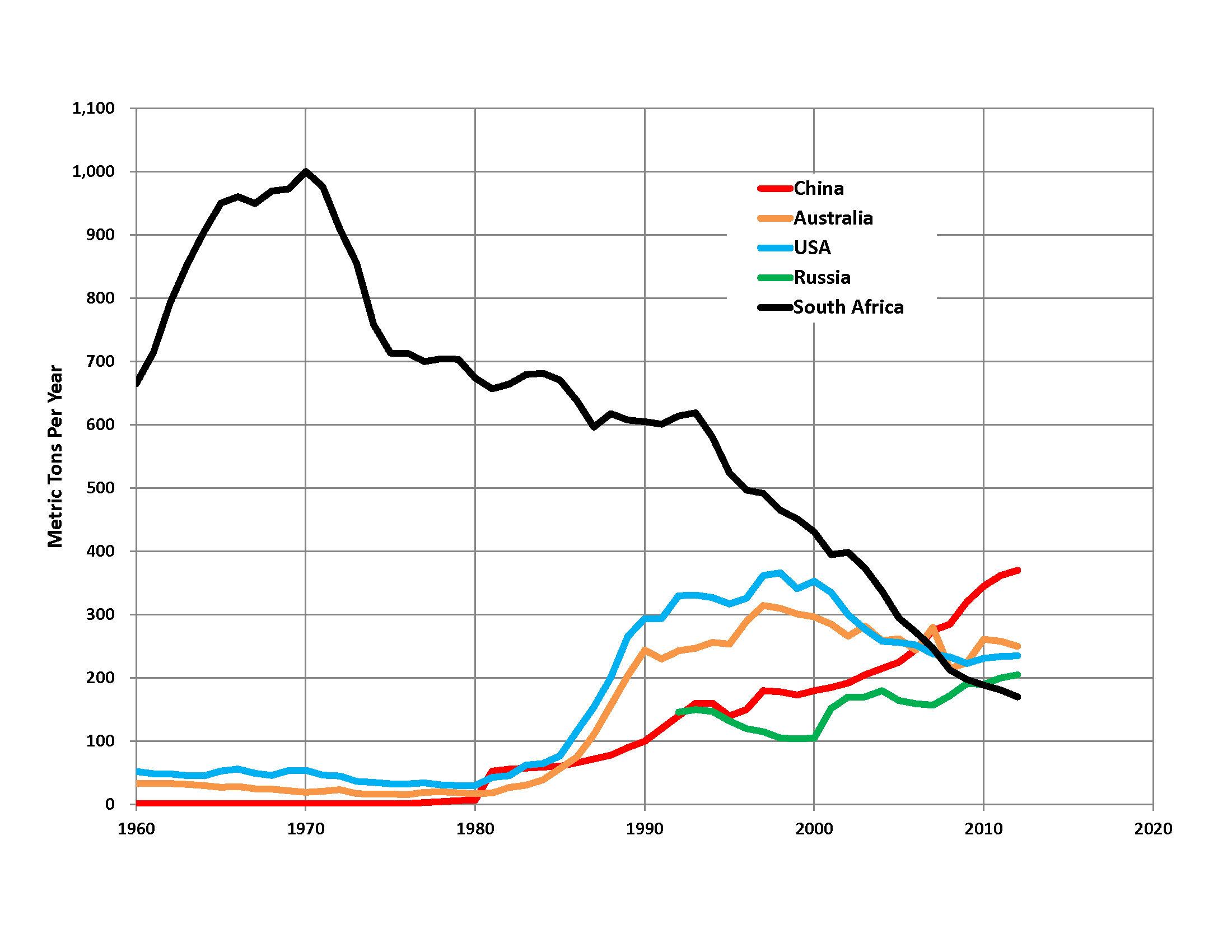
Top 5 gold producing nations

In December 2018, World Wide Fund for Nature (WWF) released an official report giving environmental ratings for 15 major watch manufacturers and jewelers in Switzerland. Piaget was ranked No. 3 among the 15 manufacturers and, along with 3 other manufacturers including Vacheron Constantin and Jaeger-LeCoultre, was given an average environmental rating as "Upper Midfield", suggesting that the manufacturer has taken first actions addressing the impact of its manufacturing activities on the environment and climate change. According to Piaget's official document, the company is committed to "preserving natural resources and minimizing its environmental impact".

In jewelry and watchmaking industry, there are concerns over the lack of transparency in manufacturing activities and the sourcing of precious raw materials such as gold, which is a major cause of environmental issues such as pollution, soil degradation and deforestation. The situation is especially serious in the developing countries which are top producers of gold, including China, Russia and South Africa. It is estimated that the watch and jewelry sector uses over 50% of world's annual gold production (over 2,000 tons), but in most cases the watch companies are not able to or are unwilling to demonstrate where their raw materials come from and if the material suppliers use eco-friendly sourcing technologies.

== Prizes and awards ==
- In 2000, the jury of Montres Passion awarded the prize of “Watch of the Year” to the Emperador model.
- At the Geneva Watchmaking Grand Prix, the Piaget 1967 watch was awarded the “Design Watch Prize” in 2002 and the Altiplano XL watch won the “Ultra-Flat Watch Prize” in 2003.
- At the Geneva Watchmaking Grand Prix, Piaget were awarded the Ladies’ Jewellery Watch Prize in 2006, for their Limelight Party model.
- In 2006 the Limelight Party watch was also elected “Most beautiful watch of 2006” by the magazine Vogue Joyas Spain.
- The Piaget Polo Chronograph watch was elected “Watch of the Year 2007” in the Chronograph category by the jury of the French magazine La Revue des Montres.
- The Emperador model received the prize of Men's Watch of the Year 2007 (Middle East Watch of the Year Awards 2007), organised by the magazine Alam Assaat Wal Moujawharat.
- The Limelight Party Secret watch was named “Watch of the Year 2007” in the Ladies’ Watch category by the Belgian magazine Passion des Montres.

=== Piaget Best Jeweller Prize ===
In 2005, Piaget created their Best Jeweller Prize. This prize is awarded to the most deserving student of the Certificat Fédéral de Capacité in watchmaking. Dorian Recordon was the first holder of the qualification to receive this prize.

== Notable people ==
- Philippe Léopold-Metzger, CEO from 1981 until 2017
- Camille Pilet, former world sales director
- Stéphanie Sivrière, creative director of jewelry and watches

== See also ==
- List of watch manufacturers
