= USS Memphis (SSN-691) =

Los Angeles-class nuclear-powered attack submarine of the US Navy

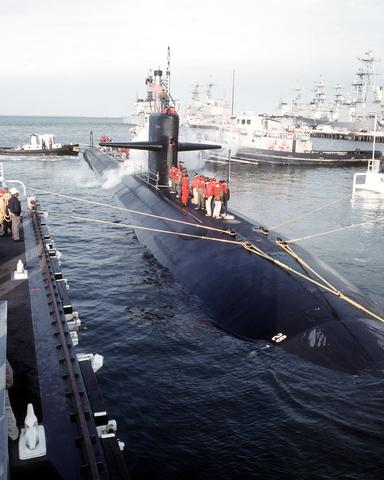
- USS Memphis

History

United States
- Name: Memphis
- Namesake: The City of Memphis, Tennessee
- Awarded: 4 February 1971
- Builder: Newport News Shipbuilding
- Laid down: 23 June 1973
- Launched: 3 April 1976
- Sponsored by: Mrs. Cathy Beard
- Commissioned: 17 December 1977
- Decommissioned: 1 April 2011
- Stricken: 1 April 2011
- Status: Stricken, to be disposed of by submarine recycling
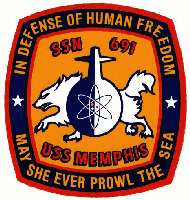
- Badge

General characteristics
- Class & type: Los Angeles-class submarine
- Displacement: 5,716 tons light; 6,087 tons full; 371 tons dead
- Length: 110.3 m (361 ft 11 in)
- Beam: 10 m (32 ft 10 in)
- Draft: 9.4 m (30 ft 10 in)
- Propulsion: S6G nuclear reactor, 2 turbines, 35,000 hp (26 MW), 1 auxiliary motor 325 hp (242 kW), 1 shaft
- Speed: 15 knots (28 km/h) surfaced; 32 knots (59 km/h) submerged
- Test depth: 290 m (950 ft)
- Complement: 12 Officers; 98 Enlisted
- Armament: 4 × 21 in (533 mm) bow tubes

USS Memphis (SSN-691), a Los Angeles-class submarine, was the sixth ship of the United States Navy to be named for Memphis, Tennessee. The contract to build her was awarded to Newport News Shipbuilding and Dry Dock Company in Newport News, Virginia, on 4 February 1971, and her keel was laid down on 23 June 1973. She was launched on 3 April 1976 sponsored by Mrs. Cathy Beard (née Rieniets), wife of Congressman Robin L. Beard Jr., and commissioned on 17 December 1977, with Commander G. Dennis Hicks in command.

In March 1981, Memphis completed an around-the-world cruise via the Panama Canal, including operations with both the Sixth and Seventh Fleets.

Memphis was redesignated an experimental submarine during 1989 to test composite hull structures, unmanned underwater vehicles, advanced sonars, hull friction-reduction, and other advanced technologies for the Los Angeles and Seawolf classes, but remained combat-capable.

During a mid-1990s refit, Memphis received numerous modifications, which added about 50 tons to her displacement, most of it aft. they are:

- Glass-reinforced plastic turtleback abaft the sail to accommodate remotely operated vehicles
- Towing winch and drum for experimental towed sonar arrays
- Added 4.27 m-high by 1.37 m-wide vertical surfaces at the ends of the stern stabilizers to accommodate sonar transducer arrays
- A 54 mm towed array dispenser in the port fin leading to the new winch abaft the sail
- Supports for the stern stabilizers
- new hydraulic systems
- Fiber-optic data bus
- Some 58 standardized equipment racks to accommodate electronic test gear

In February 1993 Memphis ran aground offshore of Dania Beach, Florida. The grounding caused physical damage to the reef substrate and biological damage to the coral community, which was of the Holocene era and with no recent framework growth over 6,000 years. The State of Florida sued the U.S. Navy for $2.4 million, and was awarded $750,000 for mitigation and repairs.

In January 1994, Memphis entered Portsmouth Naval Shipyard for refueling, overhaul, and modifications to support her research-and-development role. Upon completion of the shipyard availability, she was assigned to Submarine Development Squadron 12 in Groton, Connecticut.

In 1998 Memphis tested the Lockheed Martin Undersea Systems Universal Gravity Module passive-bottom profiler navigational system.

On 3 May 2005, Memphis deployed and conducted two polar transits, returning to New London on 3 November 2005.

Memphis won the coveted Battenberg Cup in 2005, as well as the Squadron 12 Battle E.

On 6 May 2006, Memphis deployed against Iraqi insurgency, returning to New London, Connecticut, on 7 August.

On 27 June 2007, Memphis returned to Portsmouth Naval Shipyard in Kittery, Maine, for a preinactivation restricted availability. She returned to Groton on 8 May 2008.

After 33 years of service, Memphis was removed in a decommissioning ceremony at the Shepherd of the Sea Chapel located at the US Submarine Base in Groton, Connecticut, on 1 April 2011. Memphis went to the Portsmouth Naval Shipyard to begin the inactivation process.

Parts from the decommissioned Memphis were to be used to repair the damaged USS Miami, until the decision to cease work on Miami was made in August 2013.

== Cheating controversy ==
In November 2010, Navy investigators discovered rampant cheating taking place on training examinations among the submarine's crew; the skipper, Commander Charles Maher, was removed. Thirteen other crewmembers were also removed. Navy officers interviewed by the Associated Press stated that training exam cheating was widespread within the Navy's submarine force.

== See also ==
- USS Toledo (SSN-769)
- HMS Splendid (S106)
- Kursk submarine disaster
