= Broderick Wright =

Australian rugby league footballer

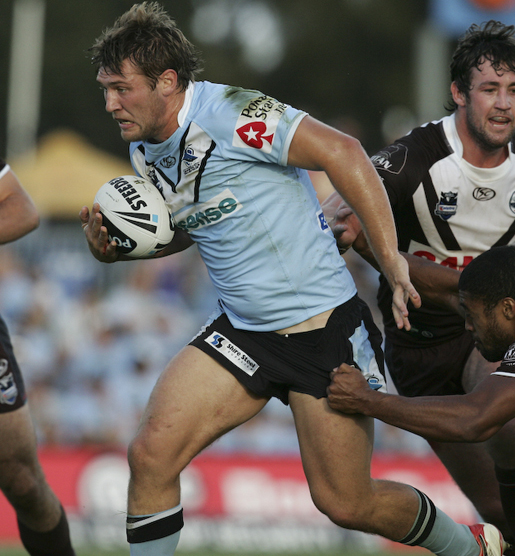

Personal information
- Full name: Broderick Wright
- Born: 24 July 1987 (age 38) Sydney, Australia
- Height: 189 cm (6 ft 2 in)
- Weight: 104 kg (16 st 5 lb)

Playing information
- Position: Prop, Second-row
Club
Years	Team	Pld	T	G	FG	P
2008–09	Parramatta Eels	13	0	0	0	0
2010–11	Cronulla-Sutherland	27	0	0	0	0
2011–12	Pia XIII		0	0	0	0
	Total	40	0	0	0	0

Broderick Wright (born 24 July 1987) is an Australian former professional rugby league footballer who played for the Cronulla-Sutherland Sharks in the National Rugby League, as a second-row.

== Playing career ==
After graduating from Baulkham Hills High School in 2005, Wright made his debut against the North Queensland Cowboys in round 20 of the 2008 NRL season.

Wright was 18th man for Parramatta against Melbourne in the 2009 Grand Final as an injury stand-by for Nathan Cayless.

Wright signed with the Cronulla-Sutherland Sharks for the 2010 NRL season.

Wright joined French rugby league club Pia for 2011/12 season.
