= Destin Sandlin =

American engineer, science communicator, and YouTuber

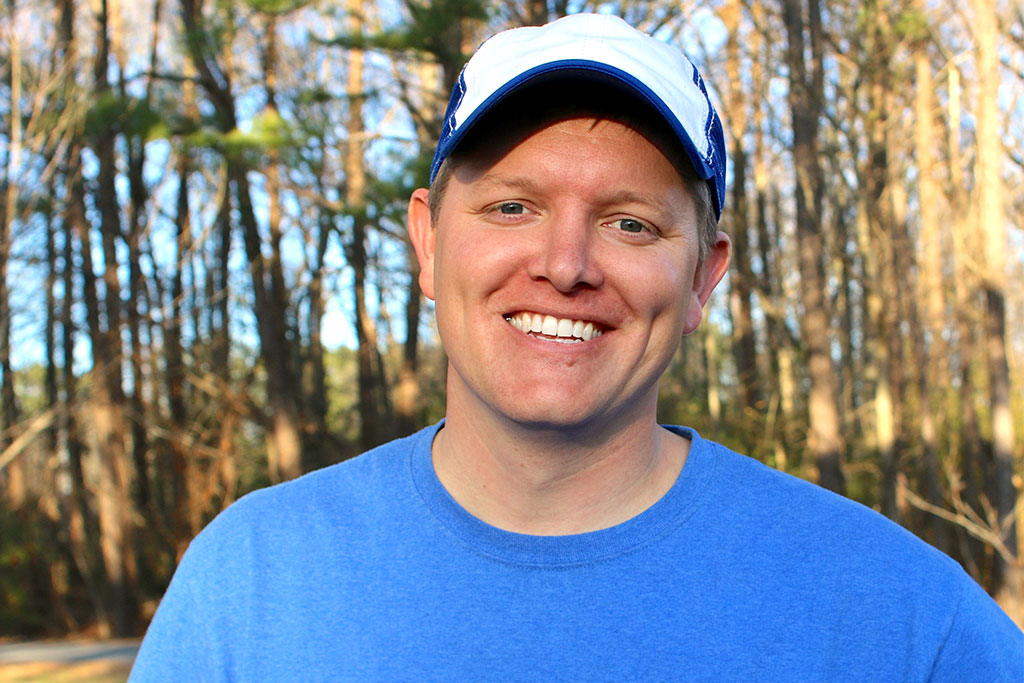
- Sandlin in 2014
- Born: Destin Wilson Sandlin; September 17, 1981 (age 45); Huntsville, Alabama, U.S.
- Education: University of Alabama (B.S.); University of Alabama, Huntsville (M.S.)
- Occupations: Rocket engineer YouTube personality
- Known for: Educational YouTube videos
- Spouse: Tara Sandlin
- Children: 4

YouTube information
- Channel: SmarterEveryDay
- Years active: 2006–present
- Genre: Educational
- Subscribers: 11.8 million
- Views: 1.26 billion
- Last updated: 5 April, 2026
- Website: www.smartereveryday.com

Destin Wilson Sandlin (born September 17, 1981) is an American engineer and science communicator who produces the video series Smarter Every Day on his YouTube channel of the same name, which was launched in 2007. Sandlin also runs the YouTube channels The Sound Traveler, Smarter Every Day 2, and a podcast called No Dumb Questions with his friend Matt Whitman.

In early 2016, Sandlin was one of three YouTube personalities chosen to conduct a one-on-one interview with then-president Barack Obama after his final State of the Union address.

== Background ==
Destin Wilson Sandlin was born September 17, 1981, in Huntsville, Alabama to Darryl and Terry Sandlin. He was raised in nearby Morgan County, and attended Hartselle High School. Sandlin has a BS in mechanical engineering from the University of Alabama and an MS in aerospace engineering from the University of Alabama in Huntsville. While an undergraduate, he was awarded the University of Alabama's Outstanding Senior Award. He also minored in business administration while at the University of Alabama. Sandlin was, until late 2018, a full-time missile flight test engineer at Redstone Arsenal. He is currently a PhD candidate at the University of Alabama in Huntsville.

== YouTube channels and podcast ==
Sandlin's interview with President Obama

=== Smarter Every Day ===
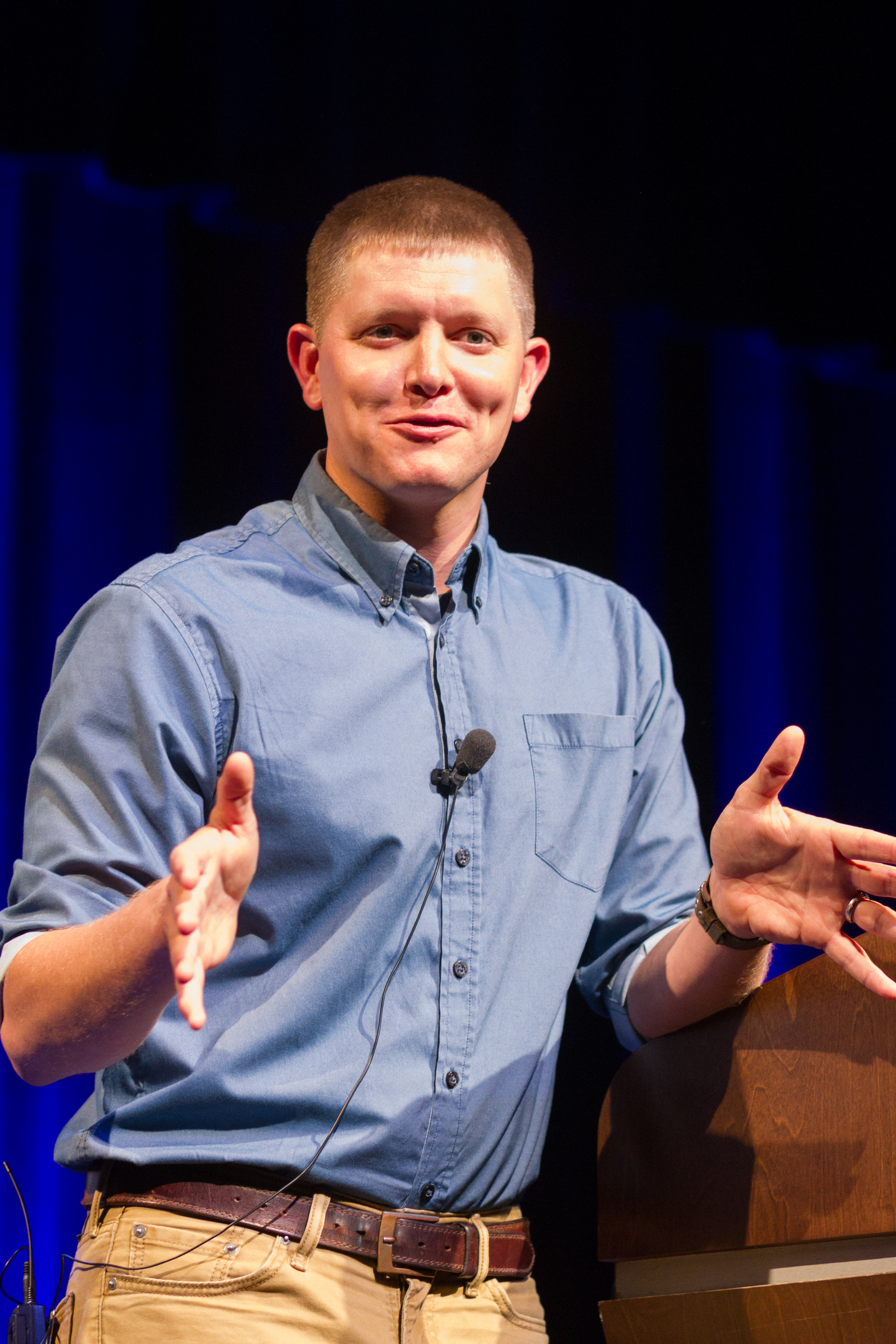
Sandlin at Skepticon in November 2015.

Sandlin began posting educational videos in 2007. His first video reached one million views on July 10, 2009.

Sandlin formally launched the Smarter Every Day series on April 24, 2011, with a video titled "Detonation vs Deflagration - Smarter Every Day 1," which became the title format for subsequent videos and the sole focus of his YouTube channel. Episodes of Smarter Every Day feature Sandlin as the host and narrator, and revolve around scientific exploration and discovery. Sandlin's primary interest and educational background is in flight and space, which appear frequently in his videos. Other notable topics have included the submarine USS Toledo (SSN-769), the effects of hypoxia on the human brain, the Prince Rupert's drop, the physics of potato cannons, the usefulness of snatch blocks, and a nearly-impossible to ride bicycle whose wheel steers in the opposite direction of its handle bars.

=== No Dumb Questions ===
In 2017, Sandlin began a podcast with his best friend from Wyoming, Matt Whitman, who runs his own YouTube channel about the Bible and Christianity.

== Personal life ==
Sandlin was born and raised in Huntsville, Alabama, and currently lives there with his wife Tara, their two daughters, and two sons. Destin and Tara previously lived in nearby Cullman.

Sandlin's family often appears in his videos. Since 2012, Sandlin has supported and partnered with "Not Forgotten", a charity that cares for orphaned boys in Peru.

Sandlin is an avid fan of the University of Alabama Crimson Tide.

Sandlin is a devout Christian. Sandlin spoke at the 2015 Skepticon on his personal reconciliation of the search for scientific truth with his faith.

Sandlin is an amateur radio operator with the callsign WS4RKT.
