= Amanda Marcotte =

American blogger (born 1977)

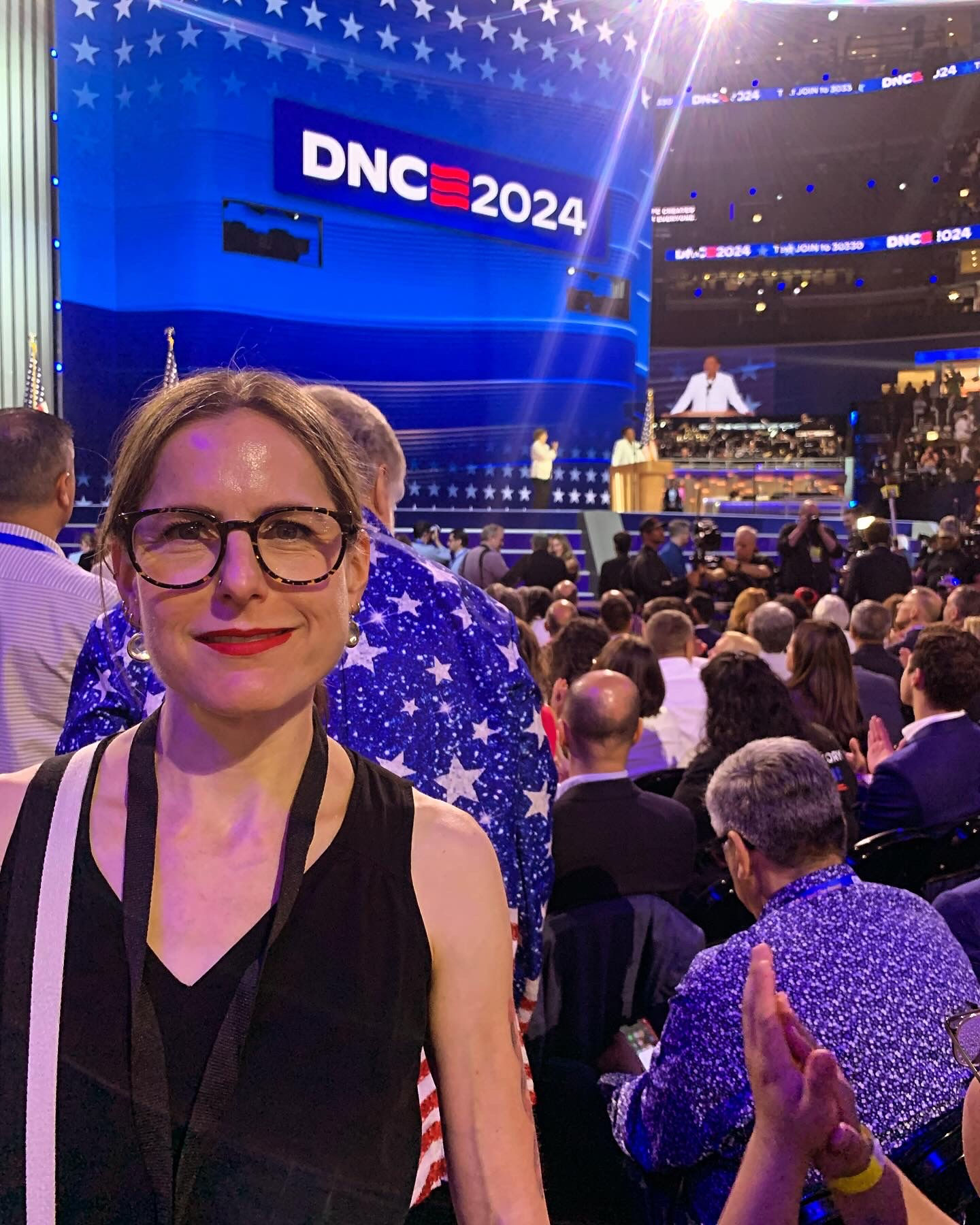
- Amanda Marcotte at the 2024 Democratic National Convention
- Born: Amanda Marie Marcotte; September 2, 1977 (age 49); El Paso, Texas, US
- Education: St. Edward's University (BA)
- Occupations: Author, blogger
- Partner: Marc Faletti
- Writing career
- Subjects: Feminism, politics
- Website: www.salon.com/writer/amanda_marcotte

Amanda Marie Marcotte (born September 2, 1977) is an American blogger and journalist who writes on feminism and politics from a liberal perspective. She has written for several online publications, including Slate, The Guardian, and Salon, where she is currently senior politics writer.

== Early life ==
Born in El Paso, Texas, Marcotte (rhymes with far-caught, according to her) was raised in the small town of Alpine, Texas. She has written that her parents divorced when she was nine years old. She graduated summa cum laude from St. Edward's University in Austin, Texas, with an BA degree in English literature. Around 2004, she began writing for the liberal blog Pandagon, then later for Slate and The Guardian.

In 2004, Marcotte won a Koufax Award from Washington Monthly for her Mouse Words blog.

== Career ==
In early 2007 Time magazine called Marcotte "an outspoken voice of the left", writing, "there is a welcome wonkishness to Marcotte, who, unlike some star bloggers, is not afraid to parse policy with her readers". Time also called her blogging "provocative and profanity-laced".

In early 2007, Marcotte made several controversial statements on her blog, including criticism of the men falsely accused in the Duke lacrosse case, using vulgar language to refer to Catholic doctrine on the Virgin birth of Jesus, and describing the Catholic Church's opposition to birth control as motivated by a desire to force women to "bear more tithing Catholics".

On January 30, 2007, John Edwards's 2008 presidential campaign hired Marcotte as its blogmaster, saying that while Edwards was "personally offended" by some of Marcotte's remarks about the Catholic Church, her job as their blogmaster was secure. Following criticism, Marcotte announced her resignation from the Edwards campaign. In an article for Salon a few days later, she said her resignation was a result of being targeted by the "right-wing smear machine".

Marcotte has given presentations at Skepticon, SXSW, Women in Secularism 2, and SkepchickCon. She was formerly on the speakers' bureau of the Secular Student Alliance.

Marcotte is the author of It's a Jungle Out There: The Feminist Survival Guide to Politically Inhospitable Environments (2008), Get Opinionated (2010), and Troll Nation: How the Right Became Trump-worshipping Monsters Set on Rat-f*cking Liberals, America, and Truth Itself (2018). The illustrations of It's a Jungle Out There, featuring a blonde woman in a tropical forest battling various mobs of brown-skinned people, were widely criticized as racist, and Marcotte and publisher Seal Press issued an apology; Seal Press also stated any future print runs of the book would have different illustrations. Previously, in 2007, a possible cover for the book with a "King Kong-like ape-ravishing-white-woman image" had been dropped.

As of 2021, Marcotte writes full-time for Salon; her stories are often republished and syndicated through partner sites including Pandagon successor Raw Story, and at Alternet.

== Personal life ==
Marcotte moved to Philadelphia in 2018.

In 2019, she wrote that she had "been a pescatarian for 16 or 17 years".

Her 2010 book Get Opinionated indicated her partner's name is Marc Faletti; in 2024, she said that he "owns a record store called Latchkey in Philadelphia", and that they have three cats.

She is an atheist.
