= USS Toledo (SSN-769) =

Los Angeles-class nuclear-powered attack submarine of the US Navy

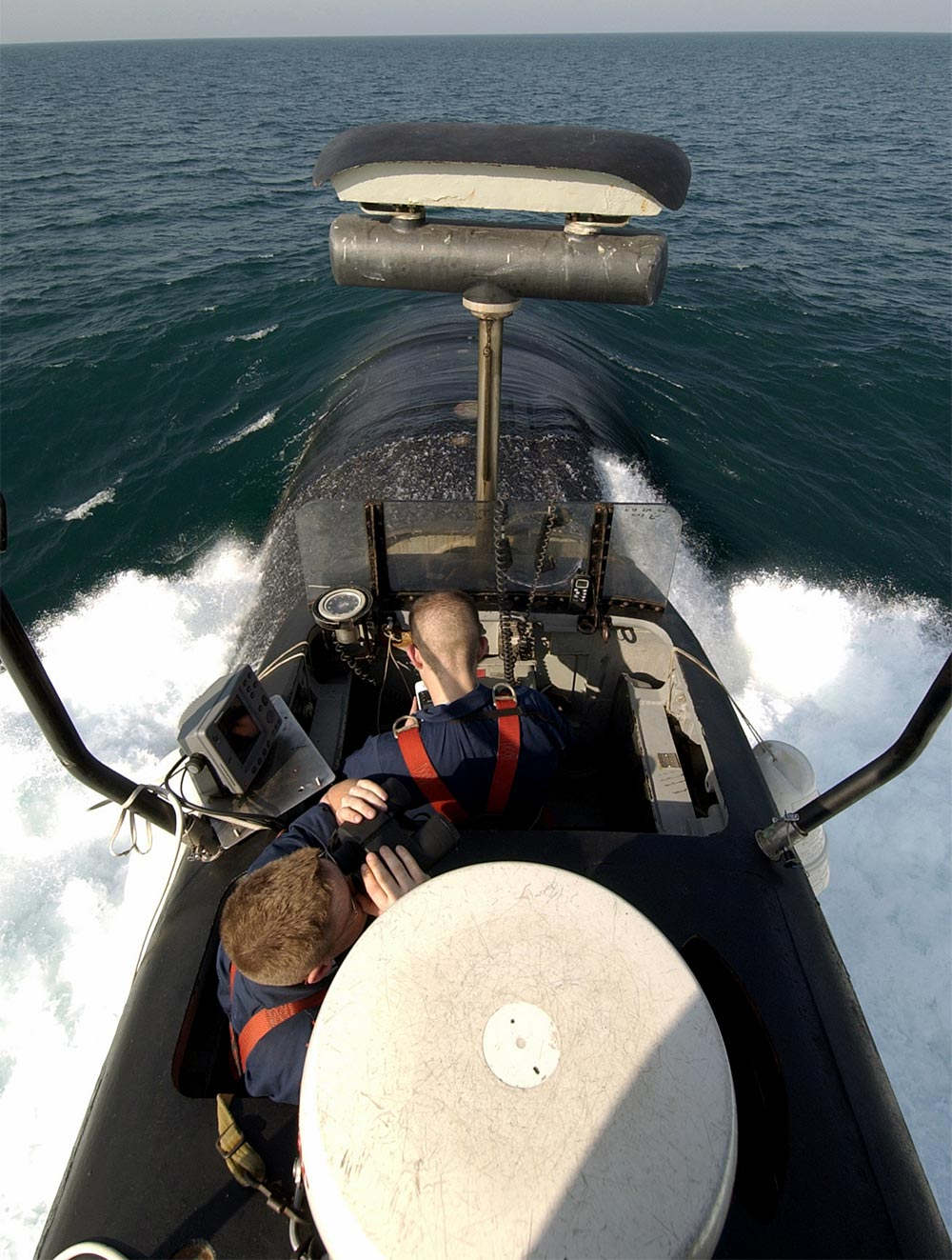
- USS Toledo (SSN-769)

History

United States
- Name: USS Toledo
- Namesake: The City of Toledo, Ohio
- Awarded: 10 June 1988
- Builder: Newport News Shipbuilding and Drydock Company
- Laid down: 6 May 1991
- Launched: 28 August 1993
- Sponsored by: Mrs. Sabra Smith
- Commissioned: 24 February 1995
- Home port: Joint Base Pearl Harbor-Hickham
- Identification: MMSI number: 369970226; Callsign: NTOH
- Motto: "Forged from Metal, Prepared for Battle"
- Nickname(s): Sword of Freedom
- Honors and awards: Naval Unit Commendation
- Status: In active service
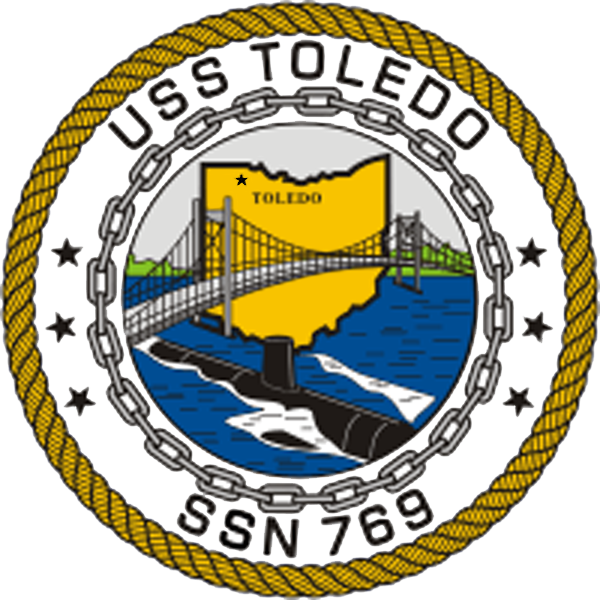
- Badge

General characteristics
- Class & type: Los Angeles-class submarine
- Displacement: 6,000 long tons (6,096 t) light; 6,927 long tons (7,038 t) full; 927 long tons (942 t) dead
- Length: 110.3 m (361 ft 11 in)
- Beam: 10 m (32 ft 10 in)
- Draft: 9.4 m (30 ft 10 in)
- Propulsion: 1 × S6G PWR nuclear reactor with D2W core (165 MW), HEU 93.5%; 2 × steam turbines (33,500) shp; 1 × shaft; 1 × secondary propulsion motor 325 hp (242 kW)
- Complement: 12 officers, 98 men
- Armament: 4 × 21 in (533 mm) torpedo tubes; 12 × vertical launch Tomahawk missiles

USS Toledo (SSN-769), is a United States Navy, Los Angeles-class, nuclear-powered, attack submarine and the third U.S. Naval vessel to be named for the city of Toledo, Ohio. The contract to build her was awarded to Newport News Shipbuilding and Dry Dock Company in Newport News, Virginia, on 10 June 1988, and her keel was laid down on 6 May 1991. She was launched on 28 August 1993, sponsored by Mrs. Sabra Smith, and commissioned on 24 February 1995.

== History ==
Her first deployment was to the Mediterranean with the George Washington Carrier Strike Group in 1997–1998, followed by a six-month tour of the North Atlantic.

=== Kursk incident ===
Toledo and Memphis were observing Russian naval exercises in August 2000. There, Russian cruise missile submarine Kursk suffered a catastrophic incident and sank. Russian Navy officials initially made numerous claims that the sinking of Kursk was caused by a collision with one of the US submarines, though evidence clearly disproved such a theory; the underwater seismic signals recorded matched those of an explosion and not a collision with another vessel, and the US submarines were fully operational after the incident (the claim being Toledo would have been severely damaged or sunk by a hypothetical collision, being less than half of Kursk's displacement). The loss of Kursk was officially attributed to a faulty dummy torpedo leaking highly volatile high-test peroxide, setting off a chain reaction that detonated five to seven combat-ready torpedo warheads.

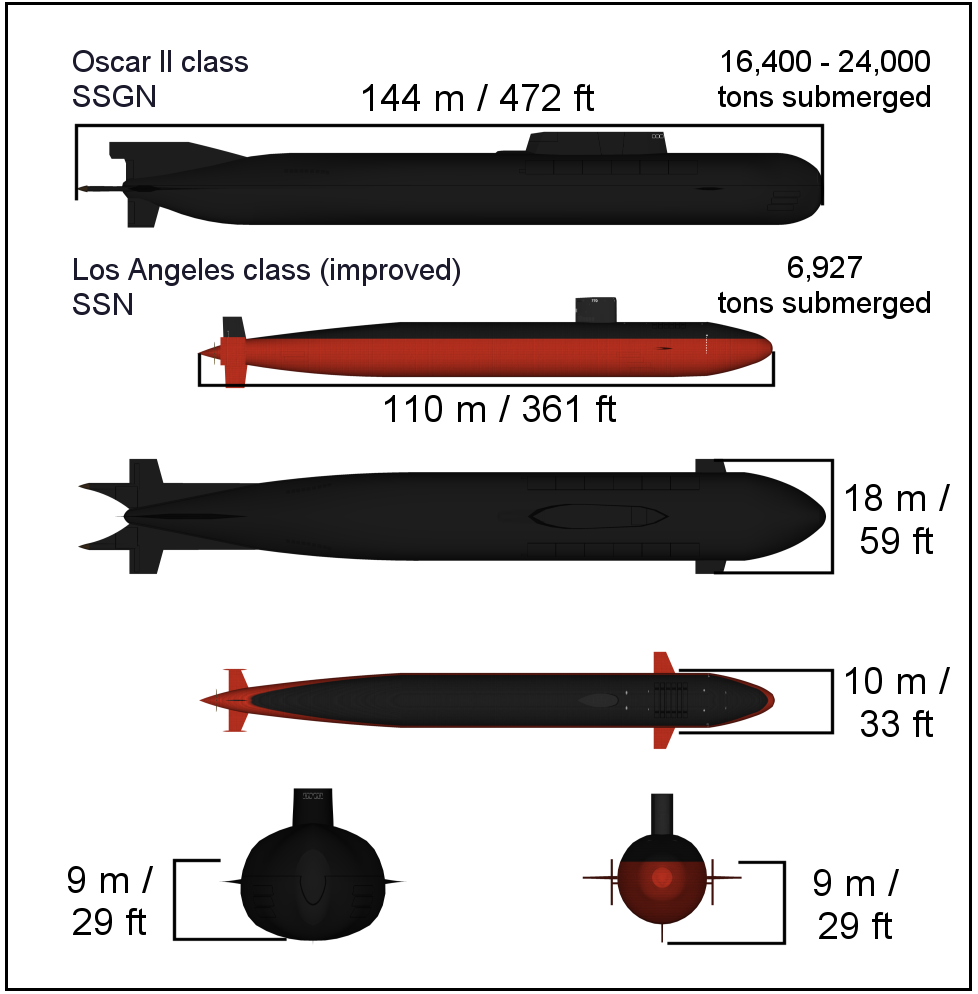
Size and mass comparison of Kursk and USS Toledo, which is less than half of Kursk's displacement

=== 2001-2006 deployments ===
Toledo deployed to the Mediterranean again in late 2001-early 2002 in support of Operation Enduring Freedom.

Toledo returned to the Naval Submarine Base New London in mid-April 2003 after having taken part in the Iraq War.

On 7 December 2004, Toledo returned to Groton, Connecticut, after a six-month deployment in the Persian Gulf with the John F. Kennedy Carrier Strike Group that included port calls in Crete, Dubai, and Bahrain. Her route home from Bahrain was unusual, rounding the Cape of Good Hope rather than using the Suez Canal. Once back in the North Atlantic, she was diverted for a classified drug interdiction mission with the Joint Interagency Task Force–South in the Caribbean Sea.

On 31 January 2006, Toledo again departed for a six-month deployment to CENTCOM. Ports of call included Augusta Bay, Sicily, Dubai, the British Indian Ocean Territory of Diego Garcia, and La Maddalena. She returned from this deployment on 31 July 2006.

=== Maintenance 2006–2009 ===
Northrop Grumman Corporation was awarded a contract from the U.S. Navy for maintenance work, known as a depot modernization period, on Toledo. The initial planning contract was valued at about $34.7 million. The final value, including the actual execution, was $178.5 million. She arrived in December 2006 to Newport News, and the work was completed in March 2009. The project was delayed for eight months because of about 2,000 project changes. This was a competitive award under a Naval Sea Systems Command multiple award contract.

In July 2009, two hull cracks, including one in her pressure hull, were discovered during a routine inspection. Although the Navy and Northrop Grumman launched two investigations into welding practices at the yard while Toledo was under maintenance, the cracks did not appear to be related to welds.

=== Return to service ===
Toledo left for another six-month deployment on 23 July 2010. In December 2010, she made a port call in Haifa, Israel. Commander Reckamp was received by the Haifa City Mayor Yona Yahav in the City Hall as is customary for visiting commanders of warships making port calls in Haifa.

On 20 January 2011, Toledo returned to Groton, Connecticut, after a six-month deployment that included port calls in Cyprus, Bahrain, and Haifa.

On 12 September 2019, Toledo completed an eight-month EUCOM deployment that included port calls in Faslane, Scotland and Haakonsvern, Norway.

In early 2020, YouTuber and science communicator Destin Sandlin travelled aboard Toledo for 24 hours as part of a video series profiling different features and functions of the submarine.

In May 2020, the crew of Toledo was awarded the Navy Unit Commendation for an eight-month intelligence-collection deployment.

Toledo underwent an engineered overhaul at Norfolk Naval Shipyard, which was completed in April 2025.
