= Philippe Léopold-Metzger =

French-American businessman (born 1954)

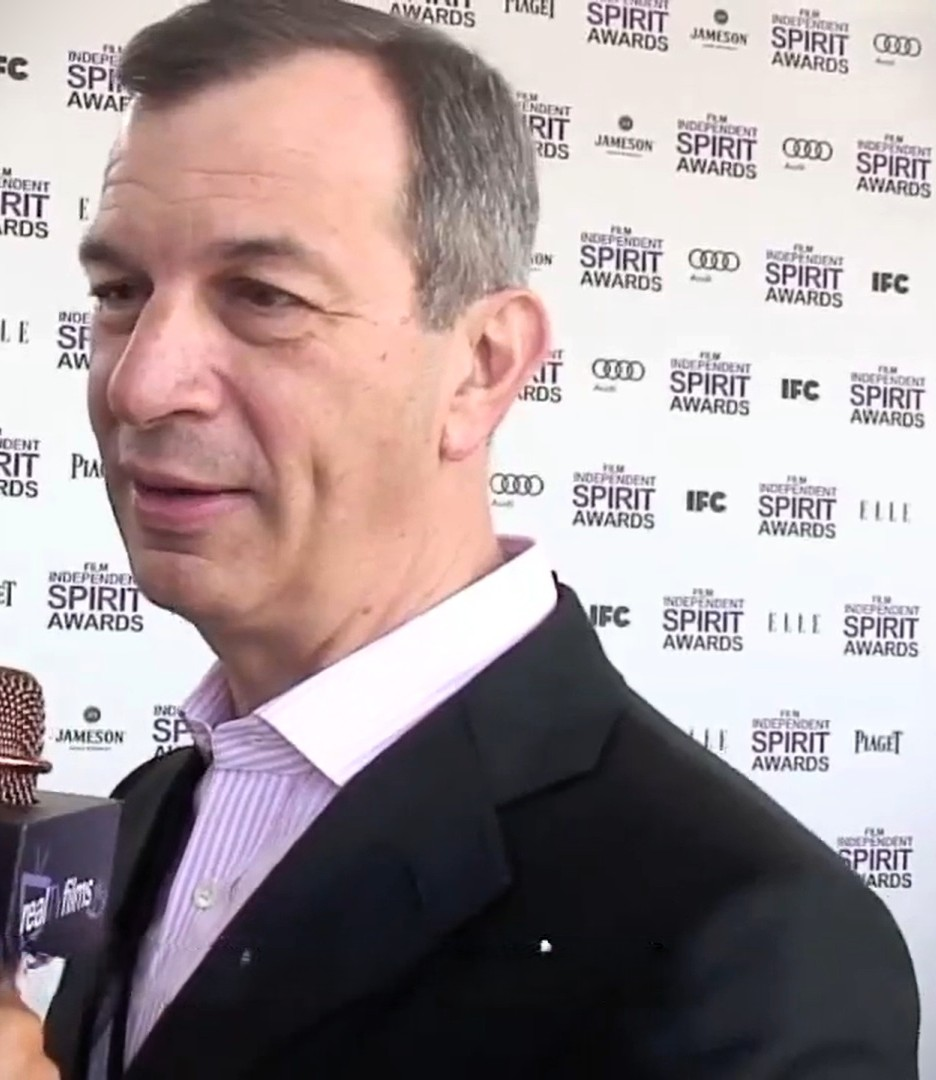
- Leopold-Metzger in 2012
- Born: December 6, 1954 (age 71)
- Education: EDHEC Business School, Northwestern University Kellogg School of Management
- Occupation: Businessman
- Title: Non-executive Chairman of Piaget SA
- Board member of: Piaget SA

Philippe Léopold-Metzger is a French-American businessman. He was CEO of Piaget SA from 1981 until 2017, when he was succeeded by Chabi Nouri and became non-executive Chairman.

== Biography ==
Philippe Léopold-Metzger was born in 1954 in New York. He has dual French and Swiss nationality.

He graduated from EDHEC Business School and Northwestern University Kellogg School of Management.

He joined Richemont in 1981, and held various positions within Cartier: President of Cartier Canada, CEO of Cartier Great Britain, and CEO of Cartier Asia Pacific. He then became CEO of Piaget SA in 1981

He supported Piaget’s entry into e-commerce. During his tenure, Piaget prioritized strengthening its brand’s identity as a watchmaker at the expense of its jewellery segment. He considerably expanded the company’s business in Asia.
