= Stephanie Kantis =

American jewelry designer (born 1968)

- Born: February 3, 1968; St. Louis, Missouri
- Education: Interior Design & Architecture
- Alma mater: American University in London; Florida International University
- Occupation: Jewelry designer
- Website: http://www.stephaniekantis.com

Stephanie Kantis (born February 3, 1968, in St. Louis, Missouri) is an American jewelry designer based in Palm Beach, Florida.

== Early life and education ==
Kantis was born to Andrew and Cassandra Kantis. She grew up in St. Louis, Missouri.

Kantis attended the American University in London and graduated from Florida International University. After graduating with a degree in interior design, she moved to Dallas, Texas.

== Career ==
Shortly after moving to Dallas, Texas, Kantis was the first to design and manufacture custom, luxury baby cribs. She formed what became the premier luxury children's apparel, accessories and furniture brand under the name Stephanie Anne. Kantis established her first store – Stephanie Anne Room to Grow – on Lovers Lane (dubbed the Miracle Mile) in Dallas, Texas, in 1995. In 1999, Kantis started her second retail location near the Galleria on Post Oak Road in Houston, Texas. Kantis was the first to manufacture and retail a full scale luxury retail line for children in multiple categories.

In 2005, based on demand from her customers, Kantis converted her store to a luxury home decor business. Kantis began designing and manufacturing everything from bed linens, furniture, tabletop, and lighting for distribution in her store. Kantis also started to get back to her roots of interior design and established a thriving residential interior design business with major projects in Dallas, Aspen, Miami, Palm Beach, Cabo San Lucas, and many other locations.

In 2006, based on the plans to upgrade Highland Park Village, Kantis moved her Dallas store to the flagship corner in Highland Park Village. In 2009, Kantis introduced her loungewear and cashmere collections in her Highland Park Village store.

During a visit back to Dallas at the end of the summer of 2010, Neiman Marcus asked Kantis to show her collection to them. Kantis did so and Neiman Marcus wanted to test the line in Florida, where the designer's name was not as well known. Kantis held trunk shows at the Neiman Marcus Palm Beach and Neiman Marcus Boca Raton Stores in December 2010. Neiman Marcus quickly placed an order for 3 of their stores (Palm Beach, Boca Raton, and Coral Gables) in spring 2011 under the Stephanie Anne Brand. Neiman Marcus expanded to 8 stores in the fall of 2011. By the fall of 2012, Stephanie Kantis was in 20 Neiman Marcus stores. Saks Fifth Avenue soon discovered the line and placed a launch order for 12 of their stores in Spring 2013. Kantis, at this point, decided to change the brand that all her jewelry was sold under to Stephanie Kantis. This change was announced and shown in Vogue with the spring 2013 jewelry launch.

Bloomingdale's discovered Stephanie Kantis in 2016 and launched the brand in 16 stores and on Bloomingdales.com in fall 2016.

Kantis has been featured in Vogue, W, Harper’s Bazaar, Town & Country, Allure, O Magazine and InStyle.
