= Stéphanie Sivrière =

French watchmaker

- Born: 1975 (age 50–51); Paris, France
- Education: Haute École de Joaillerie
- Occupations: Watchmaker, jewellery designer
- Employer: Piaget SA

Stéphanie Sivrière is a French watchmaker and high jewellery designer. She is the creative director of jewelry and watches for Piaget SA.

== Biography ==
Sivrière was born in Paris in 1975. She studied jewellery making at the Haute École de Joaillerie in Paris and, upon graduation, worked as a freelance jeweler on Place Vendôme. Sivrière joined Piaget as a jewelry designer in 2002. She became the director of jewelry creations in 2011 and was assigned responsibility for Piaget's entire watch department in 2017.

Sivrière oversees both jewellery design and watchmaking, managing a studio team of 9 craftspeople. She has stated that there is "no difference between designing timepieces and crafting jewellery", noting how most people at Piaget start with watchmaking before moving into jewellery, compared to her own career where she started as a jeweler.

Sivrière has cited a return to the fashion of the 60s to help revitalize Piaget's style. She is also involved in the sourcing of gems and jewels needed for manufacturing.
