= Princess Stéphanie =

Princess Stéphanie may refer to:

- Princess Stéphanie of Monaco (born 1965), youngest child of Rainier III, Prince of Monaco, and American actress Grace Kelly
- Princess Stéphanie of Belgium (1864–1945), daughter of Léopold II, King of the Belgians, and wife of Crown Prince Rudolf of Austria
- Princess Stéphanie of Hohenzollern-Sigmaringen (1837–1859), daughter of Karl Anton, Prince of Hohenzollern, and wife of Pedro V, King of Portugal
- Princess Stéphanie of France (1789–1860), adopted daughter of Napoléon I, Emperor of the French, and wife of Karl, Grand Duke of Baden
- Princess Stephanie of Windisch-Graetz (1909–2005), daughter of Prince Otto Weriand of Windisch-Grätz
- Stéphanie, Hereditary Grand Duchess of Luxembourg (born 1984) Belgian noble, wife of Guillaume, Hereditary Grand Duke of Luxembourg

== See also ==
- Princess Stephanie's astrapia (Astrapia stephaniae), a type of bird
