= Stefi =

Stefi is a feminine given name. Notable people with the name include:

- Stefi Baum (born 1958), American astronomer
- Stefi Geyer (1888–1956), Hungarian violinist
- Stefi Talman (born 1958), Swiss shoe designer
