= Steffi =

Steffi is a feminine given name, often a short form (hypocorism) of Stephanie or Stefanie.

Steffi is the name of:

- Steffi Duna (1910-1992), Hungarian-born film actress born Erzébet Berindey
- Steffi Götzelt (born 1960), East German retired rower
- Steffi Graf (born 1969), German former tennis player
- Steffi Jacob (born 1975), German skeleton racer
- Steffi Jones (born 1972), German football manager and retired defender
- Stefanie Koch (born 1981), German ski mountaineer
- Steffi Kräker (born 1960), East German retired gymnast
- Steffi Kriegerstein (born 1992), German canoeist
- Steffi Kunke (1908–1942), Austrian teacher and anti-fascist activist
- Steffi Martin (born 1962), East German former luger
- Steffi Nerius (born 1972), German javelin thrower
- Steffi Scherzer (born 1957), German ballet dancer, director and instructor
- Steffi Sieger (born 1988), German luger
- Steffi Van Wyk (born 1995), Namibian model and Miss Namibia 2015
