= Stephanie Schweitzer =

Australian Paralympic athlete

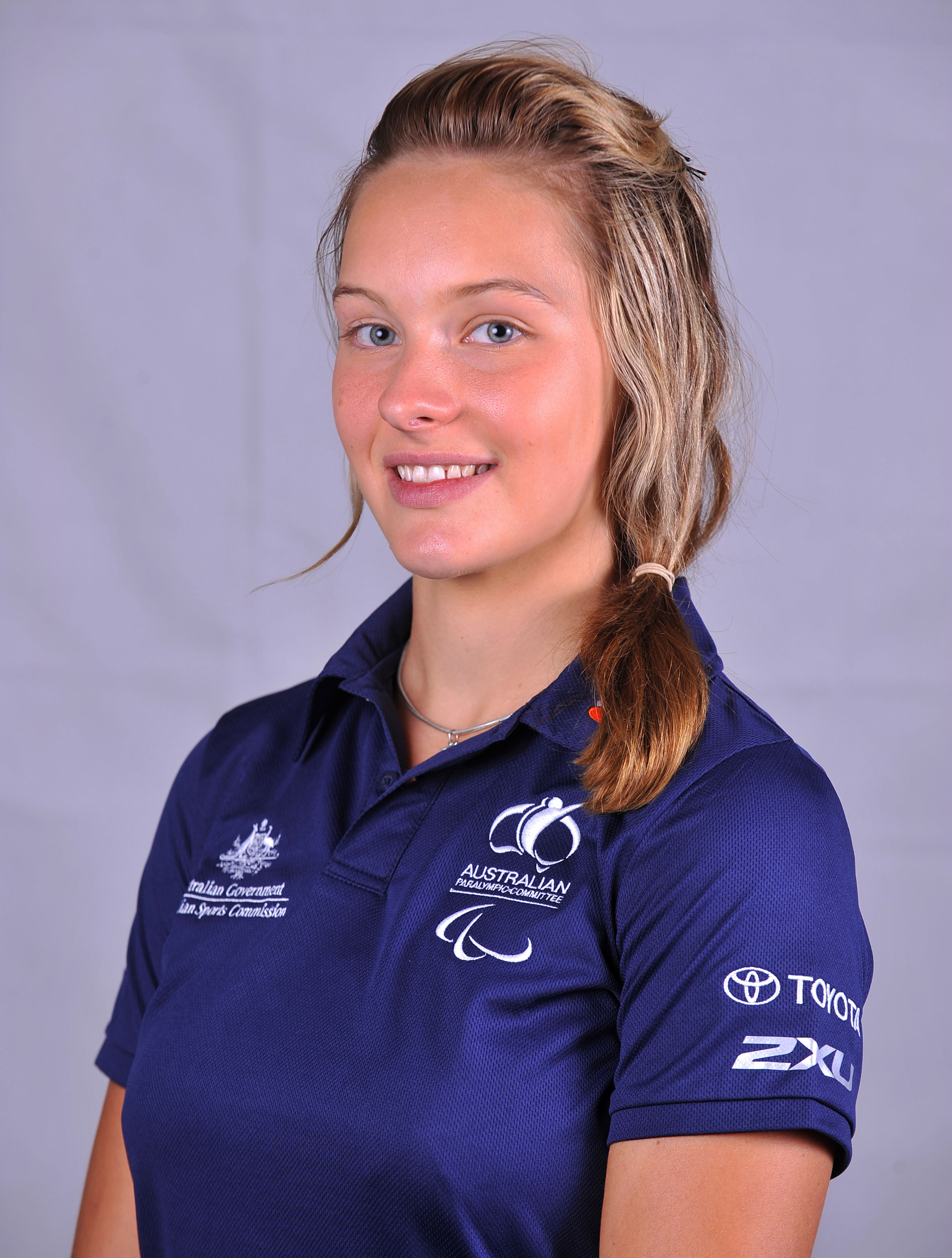
- 2012 Australian Paralympic team portrait of Schweitzer

Personal information
- Nationality: Australian
- Born: 16 September 1992 (age 33)

Sport
- Country: Australia
- Sport: Paralympic athletics

Stephanie Schweitzer (born 16 September 1992) is an Australian athletics competitor. She was selected to represent Australia at the 2012 Summer Paralympics in athletics.

== Personal ==
Schweitzer was born on 16 September 1992, and went to Baulkham Hills High School in Baulkham Hills, New South Wales. She was born with a learning disability. As of 2012, she works as a personal trainer.

== Athletics ==
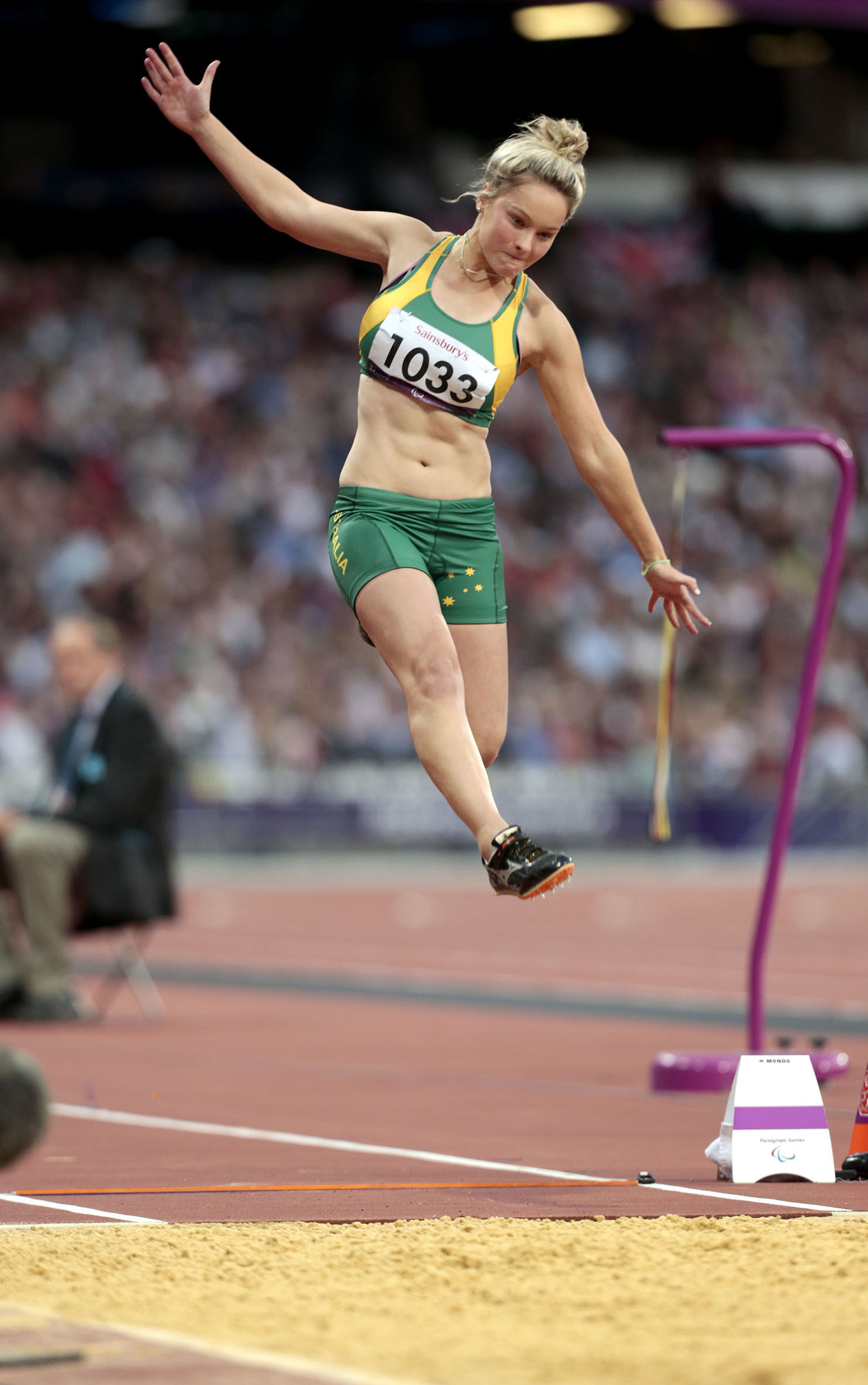
Schweitzer at the 2012 London Paralympics

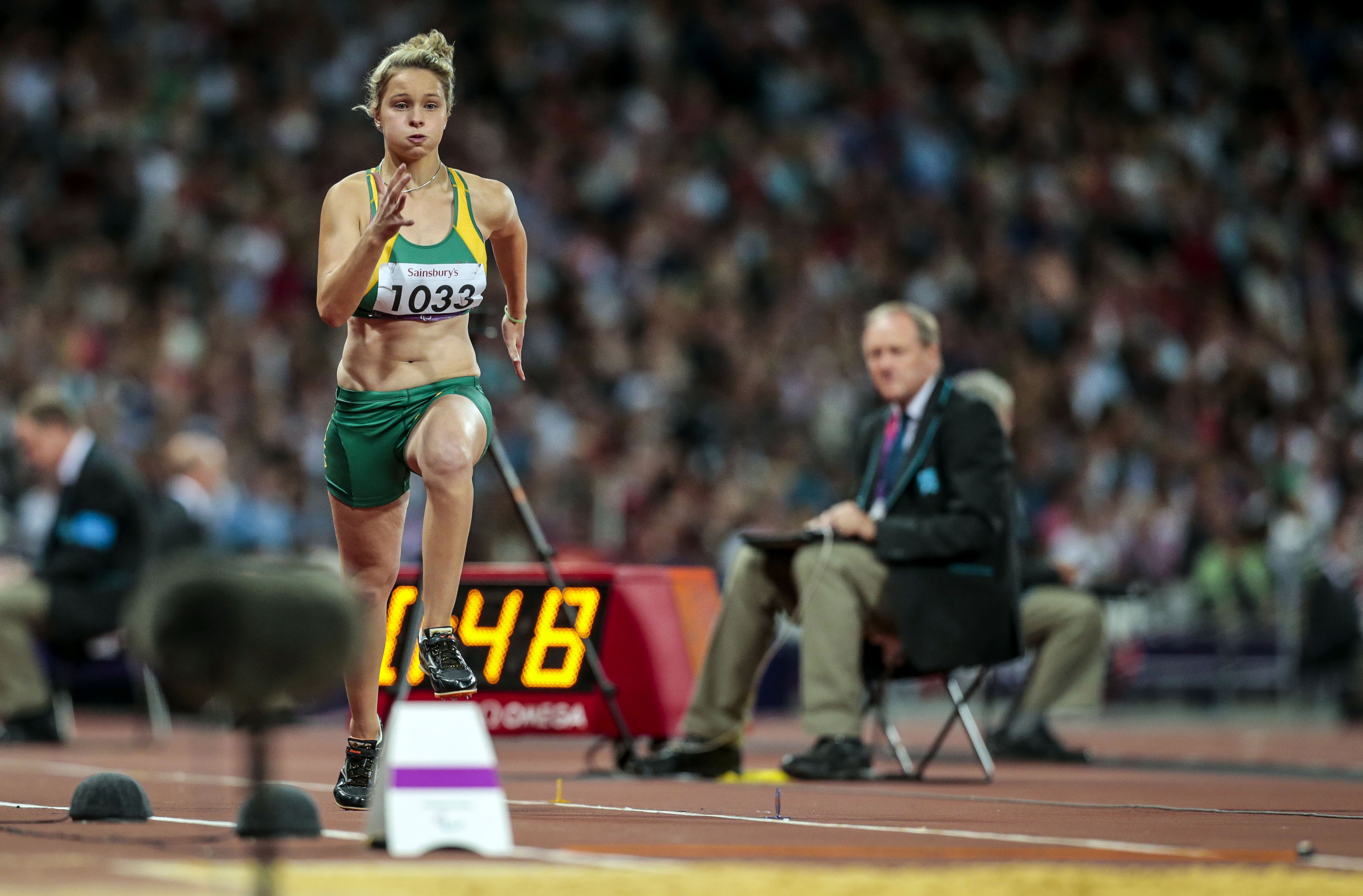
Schweitzer at the 2012 London Paralympics

Schweitzer is a T20 classified long jumper. She has an athletics scholarship with the New South Wales Institute of Sport, and is coached by Matt Rawlings.

Schweitzer started competing in 2005. She participated in the 2005 Pacific School Games. At the event, she earned one bronze medal, four silver medals and a gold medal in the long jump event. At the 2007 Australian Underage Championships, she earned a silver medal and a pair of gold medals. She competed in the 2007 National Championships. At the event, she earned a gold medal in the 400 metre event. She first represented Australia in 2007 at the INAS-FID World Championships. At the 2011 Arafura Games, she finished first in the Women Long Jump Ambulant event with a distance of 4.78 metres. She finished first in the Women's 400m Ambulant event with a time of 63.93 seconds. At the 2011 Australian Athletics Championships, she finished third in the long jump with a jump of 4.81 metres (15.8 ft). At the 2011 Para-athletes Global Games World Championships, she competed in the 100 metre, 200 metre and 400 metre events and the long jump. She finished second in the 100 metre event. She competed in the 2012 Australian Athletics Championships. With a time of 26.70 seconds, she won the 200m event. In 2012, she was ranked fifth in the world in her class in the long jump event. She was selected to represent Australia at the 2012 Summer Paralympics in athletics in the F20 long jump event. She finished 4th 2012 Games.
