= Stephanie Nilles =

American pianist, composer/arranger

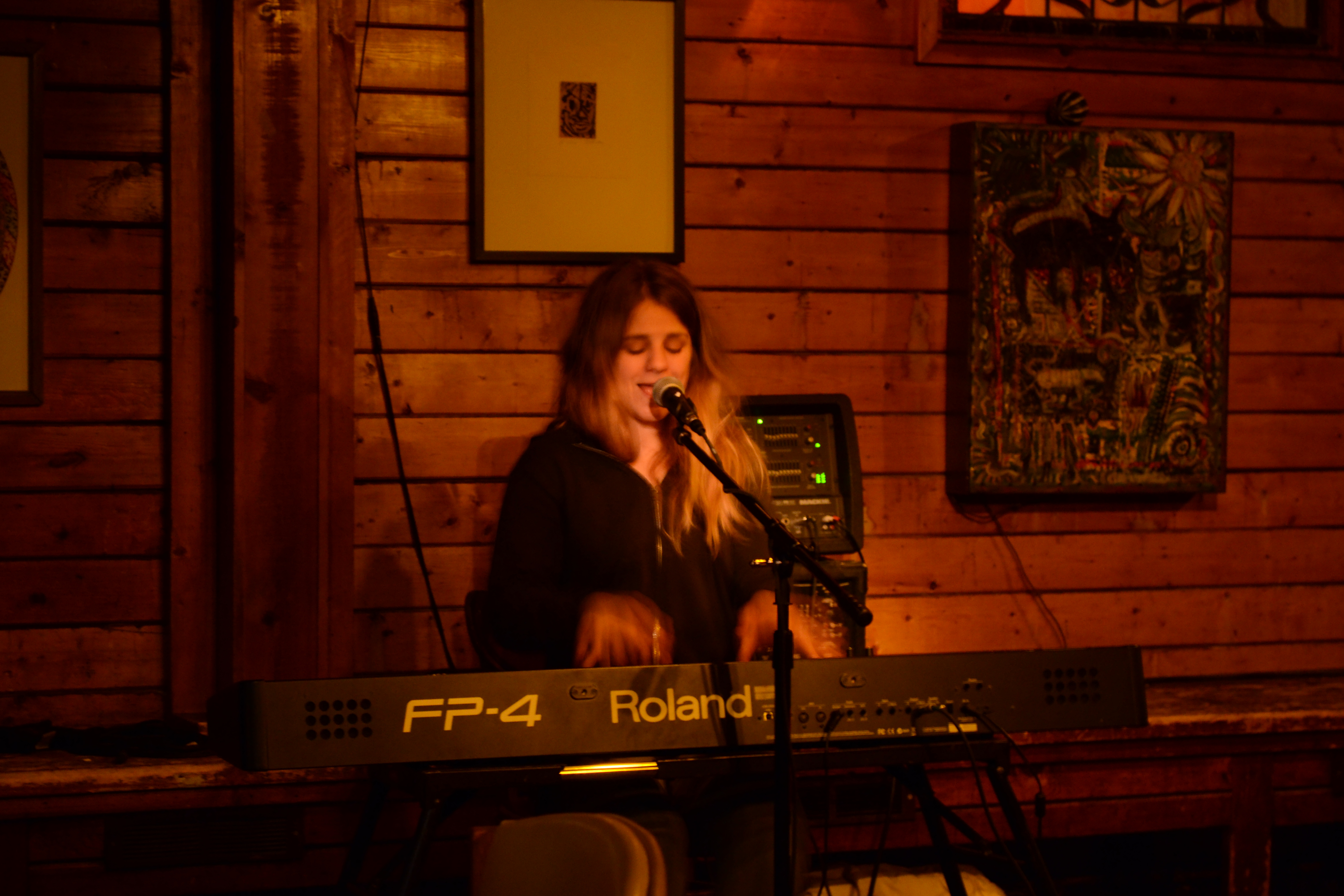

Background information
- Born: Illinois
- Occupation: Musician

Stephanie Nilles is an American pianist, composer/arranger, and singer/songwriter.

She studied classical piano and cello and graduated with a BM in piano performance from the Cleveland Institute of Music. She has toured internationally performing original music since 2008, appearing at Stimmen Festival, Festwochen Gmunden, Bardentreffen, Die Wellenklaenge Lunz am See, Calgary Folk Festival, Falcon Ridge Folk Festival, Ingolstadt Jazz Festival, and Ballydehob Jazz Festival. She was a finalist at the International Young Artists Competition and gold medalist at the Fischoff Competition. She appeared at Carnegie Hall with Bobby McFerrin as a participant of the Weill Music Institute. She is a fellow of the Wurlitzer Foundation and was an artist-in-residence in 2020.

Her recording of the music of Charles Mingus, "I pledge allegiance to the flag - the white flag..." received the NYC Jazz Record's Awards for 2021 Best of: Albums of the Year, Tributes of the Year, and Solo Recordings of the Year. She composed, recorded, and performed the score to NDR's "Jenseits von Eden" (a radio drama production of John Steinbeck's East of Eden), which was awarded the 2022 German Audiobook Prize for Best Radio Play.

She lives in New Orleans.
