= Stéphanie Mbanzendore =

Feminist activist from Burundi

- Born: Burundi
- Occupations: Feminist activist; Peace activist
- Years active: 1990s–present
- Organizations: Burundian Women for Peace and Development; Multicultural Women Peacemakers Network
- Known for: Founder of Burundian Women for Peace and Development

Stéphanie Mbanzendore is a feminist activist from Burundi, who has been based in Rotterdam in the Netherlands since 2003. She is the founder of the organization Burundian Women for Peace and Development, and the chairperson of the Multicultural Women Peacemakers Network, and is involved in several other women's rights and peace activism bodies.

== Early life ==
Stéphanie Mbanzendore was born and raised in Burundi, where she was later educated and worked. Since 2003, she has been based in Rotterdam in the Netherlands.

== Career ==
Mbanzendore is the founder of the organization Burundian Women for Peace and Development (BWPD), based in the Netherlands, which targets women and young people, and is active in the fields of peace, conflict resolution and HIV/Aids prevention, particularly in Burundi, and also working with women in Rwanda and Congo. In 2009, BWPD built a Centre for Peace in Burundi, "to increase community involvement and build a place for sustainable dialogues, workshops and trainings to take place in a long-term fashion".

In 2008, Burundian Women for Peace and Development (BWPD) was nominated for the Peace Prize, and they have been nominated by the Ministry of Gender and Human Rights in Burundi, and are a member of the National Steering Committee on UN Resolution 1325.

Mbanzendore is chairperson of the Multicultural Women Peacemakers Network. She is an advisor to the Global Fund for Women. Mbanzendore is a member of the National Forum for Women in Burundi, representing the diaspora.

== Personal life ==
Since 2003, she has lived in Rotterdam, the Netherlands.
