= Stephie =

Stephie is a feminine given name. Notable people with the name include:

- Sassy Stephie (born 1984), American professional wrestler
- Stephie D'Souza (1936–1998), Indian sportsperson
- Stephie Coplan (born 1987), American singer-songwriter of Stephie Coplan & The Pedestrians
