= Stephanie Zvan =

American skeptic, feminist activist, radio host, blogger, diary writer, fiction author

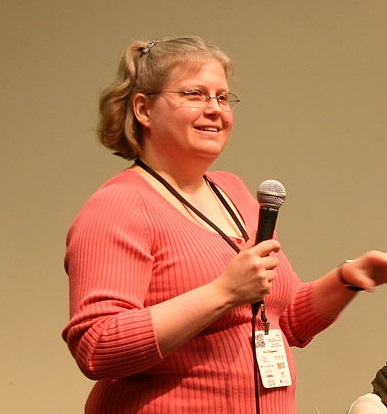
Zvan at Science Online in 2011

Stephanie Zvan is an American skeptic, feminist activist and radio host, blogger, newspaper writer, and fiction author. Her radio show, Atheists Talk, is produced by Minnesota Atheists and broadcast on KTNF in Minnesota.

Her fiction has been published in Nature and Scientific American.

Kathleen Raven has noted her as an important science/rational/skeptic blogger.

She voiced opposition to harassment of women in the Rebecca Watson elevator incident and following a 2012 Readercon F/SF convention incident, and is involved in research on "collaborative social blocking" of Internet trolls to provide a more inviting social space for women and other minorities.

== Bibliography ==
- Zvan, Stephanie (2012), "The Unexpected Consequences of Coming Out", in Bill Lehto (ed.), Atheist Voices of Minnesota: an Anthology of Personal Stories, Freethought House, ISBN 978-0615598574
- "Here be monsters", Nature
- "The Gravity of the Situation", Scientific American
