= Ștefan =

Ștefan is the Romanian form of Stephen, used as both a given name and a surname. For the English version, see Stefan.

Notable people with the name include:

== Given name ==
=== A–F ===
- Ștefan Achim (1930–2007), Romanian weightlifter
- Ștefan Andrei (1931–2014), Romanian politician
- Ștefan Apostol (born 1974), Romanian footballer
- Ștefan Ardeleanu (born 1940), Romanian fencer and coach
- Ștefan Arteni (1947–2020), Romanian artist
- Ștefan Baciu (1918–1993), Romanian and Brazilian writer
- Ștefan Baiaram (born 2002), Romanian footballer
- Ștefan Balaban (1890–1962), Romanian general
- Ștefan Balint (1926–1976), Romanian footballer
- Ștefan Balmez (1882–after 1941), Bessarabian Bulgarian politician
- Ștefan Bană (born 2004), Romanian footballer
- Ștefan Bănică Jr. (born 1967), Romanian actor, singer, and television presenter
- Ștefan Bănică Sr. (1933–1995), Romanian actor and singer
- Ștefan Bărboianu (born 1988), Romanian footballer
- Ștefan Barbu (1908–1970), Romanian footballer
- Ștefan de la Bărbulești (born 1959), Romanian singer
- Ștefan Bardan (1892–after 1947), Romanian general
- Ștefan Bârsănescu (1895–1984), Romanian academic
- Ștefan Baștovoi (born 1976), Moldavian orthodox monk, essayist, poet, painter, novelist and theologian
- Ștefan Berariu (born 1999), Romanian rower
- Ștefan Birtalan (1948–2024), Romanian handball player
- Ștefan Bîtca (born 2005), Moldovan footballer
- Ștefan Blănaru (born 1989), Romanian footballer
- Ștefan Bodișteanu (born 2003), Moldovan footballer
- Ștefan Botnarciuc (1875–1941), Moldovan politician
- Ștefan Buchiu (born 1953), Romanian Orthodox cleric, theologian, and academic
- Ștefan Burghiu (born 1991), Moldovan footballer
- Ștefan Burileanu (1874–1944), Romanian officer, engineer, academic
- Ștefan Câlția (born 1942), Romanian painter
- Ștefan Cană (born 2000), Romanian association football player
- Ștefan Cantacuzino (1675–1716), Prince of Wallachia
- Ștefan Caraulan (born 1989), Moldovan footballer
- Ștefan Cârjan (1909–1978), Romanian footballer
- Ștefan Chiper (born 1976), Romanian serial killer
- Ștefan Chirilă (born 2007), Romanian footballer
- Ștefan Ciobanu (1883–1950), Moldovan politician and historian
- Ștefan Ciobanu (footballer) (born 1979), Romanian footballer
- Ștefan Ciubotărașu (1910–1970), Romanian actor
- Ștefan Ciuntu (born 1986), Romanian rugby union player
- Ștefan Coidum (1930–2015), Romanian football player
- Ștefan Constantin (born 1959), Romania international rugby union player
- Ștefan Czinczer (1908–1980), Romanian footballer
- Ștefan Dascălu, Romanian immunologist and public health researcher
- Ștefan Demici (born 1975), Romanian rugby union player and coach
- Ștefan Dimitrescu (1886–1933), Romanian Post-impressionist painter and draftsman
- Ștefan Dobay (1909–1994), Romanian footballer and manager
- Ștefan Dobre (born 2001), Romanian footballer
- Ștefan Augustin Doinaș (1922–2002), Romanian Neoclassical poet
- Ștefan Duțu (born 2004), Romanian footballer
- Ștefan Efros (born 1990), Moldovan footballer
- Ștefan Emilian (1819–1899), Romanian architect
- Ștefan Fălcoianu (1835–1905), Romanian army general
- Ștefan Filotti (1922–1969), Romanian footballer
- Ștefan Foriș (1892–1946), Romanian communist activist, journalist, and politician

=== G–P ===
- Ștefan Gal (born 1951), Romanian gymnast
- Ștefan Iulius Gavril (born 1989), Romanian Distance Runner
- Ștefan Gheorghiu (violinist) (1926–2010), Romanian musician
- Ștefan Gheorghiu (trade unionist) (1879–1914), Romanian politician
- Ștefan Ghiță (born 1926), Romanian alpine skier
- Ștefan Golescu (1809–1874), Romanian politician
- Ștefan Gonata (1838–1896), Romanian politician and agronomist
- Ștefan Gorda (born 1960), Moldovan diplomat
- Ștefan Grasu (born 2003), Romanian basketball player
- Ștefan Grigorie (born 1982), Romanian footballer
- Ștefan Gușă (1940–1994), Romanian general
- Ștefan Haukler (1942–2006), Romanian fencer and coach
- Ștefan C. Hepites (1851–1922), Romanian physicist and meteorologist
- Ștefan Holban (general) (1869–1939), Romanian general
- Ștefan Hrușcă (born 1957), Romanian folk singer
- Ștefan Iancu (born 1997), Romanian actor
- Ștefan Iancu (rugby union) (born 1998), Romania international rugby union player
- Ștefan Ionescu (1935–2022), Romanian ice hockey player
- Ștefan Iordache (1941–2008), Romanian actor
- Ștefan Octavian Iosif (1875–1913), Romanian poet and translator
- Ștefan Iovan (born 1960), Romanian footballer
- Ștefan Konyelicska (1929–2013), Romanian rower
- Ștefan Kovács (1920–1995), Hungarian football manager
- Ștefan Kroner (born 1939), Romanian water polo player
- Ștefan Kurecska (born 1933), Romanian rower
- Ștefan Lătescu (born 2001), Romanian kickboxer
- Ștefan Lefter (born 2004), Romanian footballer
- Ștefan Luchian (1868–1916), Romanian painter
- Ștefan Macovei (born 1945), Romanian contemporary sculptor
- Ștefan Maimescu, Moldovan politician and journalist
- Ștefan Mardare (born 1987), Romanian footballer
- Ștefan Micle (1817–1879), Romanian physicist and chemist
- Ștefan Mihăileanu (1859–1900), Aromanian professor and journalist
- Ștefan Mihăilescu-Brăila (1925–1996), Romanian actor
- Ștefan Minovici (1867–1935), Romanian chemist
- Ștefan Musei (born 1995), Romanian luger
- Ștefan Mușoiu (born 1975), Romanian politician
- Ștefan Nanu (born 1968), Romanian footballer and manager
- Ștefan Neaga (1900–1951), Moldavian conductor
- Ștefan Neagoe (1838–1897), Romanian teacher and writer
- Ștefan Negrișan (born 1958), Romanian wrestler
- Ștefan I. Nenițescu (1897–1979), Romanian translator
- Ștefan Gh. Nicolau (1874–1970), Romanian physician, dermato-venerologist
- Ștefan S. Nicolau (1896–1967), Romanian physician
- Ștefan Niculescu (1927–2008), Romanian composer
- Ștefan Odagiu (born 1965), Moldovan engineer, economist and politician
- Ștefan Odobleja (1902–1978), Romanian scientist
- Ștefan Onisie (1925–1984), Romanian footballer and manager
- Ștefan Opriș (born 2007), Romanian footballer
- Ștefan Orășanu (1869–1903), Romanian historian, literary critic and poet
- Ștefan Orza (born 2001), Romanian kickboxer
- Ștefan Pănoiu (born 2002), Romanian footballer
- Ștefan Pelmuș (born 1949), Romanian artist
- Ștefan Petcu (born 1957), Romanian footballer
- Ștefan Petică (1877–1904), Romanian poet and journalist
- Ștefan Petrache (1949–2020), Moldovan singer
- Ștefan Petrescu (1931–1993), Romanian sport shooter
- Ștefan Petriceicu (1700–1690), Voivode of Moldavia
- Ștefan Pirogan (1898–1944), Romanian politician
- Ștefan Plavăț (1913–1944), Romanian resistance member
- Ștefan Pongratz (born 1930), Romanian rower
- Ștefan Pop (born 1987), Romanian singer and opera singer
- Ștefan Cicio Pop (1865–1934), Romanian politician
- Ștefan Popescu (born 1993), Romanian footballer
- Ștefan Preda (born 1970), Romanian footballer
- Ștefan Procopiu (1890–1972), Romanian physicist
- Ștefan Protopopescu (1890–1929), Romanian aviation pioneer

=== R–Z ===
- Ștefan Racoviță (1713–1782), Prince of Wallachia
- Ștefan Radu (born 1986), Romanian footballer
- Ștefan VI Rareș (1531–1552), Prince of Moldavia
- Ștefan Răzvan (died 1595), Voivode of Moldavia
- Ștefan Rusu (born 1956), Romanian wrestler
- Ștefan Sameș (1951–2011), Romanian footballer and manager
- Ștefan Secăreanu (born 1959), Moldovan politician
- Ștefan C. Șendrea (1842–1907), European jurist and politician
- Ștefan Sicaci (born 1988), Moldovan footballer
- Ștefan Somogy (born 1929), Romanian rower
- Ștefan Stan (born 1977), Romanian singer
- Ștefan Stănculescu (1923–2013), Romanian footballer
- Ștefan Ștefănescu (1929–2018), Romanian historian
- Ștefan Ștefanovici (born 2002), Romanian footballer
- Ștefan Stîngu (1941–2009), Romanian wrestler
- Ștefan Stoica (footballer) (born 1967), Romanian footballer and coach
- Ștefan Stoica (politician) (1976–2014), Romanian politician
- Ștefan Ströck (1901–1991), Romanian footballer
- Ștefan Surdul (1591–1592), Prince of Wallachia
- Ștefan Tampa (born 1943), Romanian wrestler
- Ștefan Târnovanu (born 2000), Romanian footballer
- Ștefan Tașnadi (1953–2018), Romanian weightlifter
- Ștefan Texe (born 1947), Romanian ice hockey player
- Ștefan Tita (1905–1977), Romanian writer and political figure
- Ștefan Tofan (born 1965), Romanian rugby union football player
- Ștefan Tomșa (died 1564), Ruler of Moldavia in 1563 and 1564
- Ștefan IX Tomșa (died after 1623), Prince of Moldavia
- Ștefan Tudor (1943–2021), Romanian rower
- Ștefan Urâtu (born 1951), Moldovan politician
- Ștefan Vârgolici (1843–1897), Romanian poet, critic and translator
- Ștefan Vasilache (born 1979), Romanian high jumper
- Ștefan Vasile (born 1982), Romanian sprint canoer
- Ștefan Vellescu (1838–1899), Romanian stage actor and drama teacher
- Ștefan Vlădoiu (born 1998), Romanian footballer
- Ștefan Voitec (1900–1984), Romanian journalist and politician
- Ștefan Zeletin (1882–1934), Romanian philosopher, sociologist, liberal economist and political theorist
- Ștefan Zoller (1914– 1993), Romanian handball player

== Surname ==
- Aurel Ștefan (born 1950), Romanian fencer
- Constantin Ștefan (footballer, born 1939) (1939–2012), Romanian footballer
- Constantin Ștefan (footballer, born 1951), Romanian footballer
- Dorian Ștefan (born 1959), Polish footballer
- Florin Ștefan (born 1996), Romanian professional footballer
- Gheorghe Ștefan, Prince of Moldavia from 1653 to 1658
- Gheorghe Ștefan (politician) (born 1953), Romanian politician
- Gheorghiță Ștefan (born 1986), Romanian freestyle wrestler
- Iulian Cristian Ștefan (born 2001), Romanian footballer
- Iulian Teodor Ștefan (born 1980), Romanian footballer
- Maria Ștefan (born 1954), Romanian canoe sprinter
- Mihnea Ștefan (born 1997), Romanian racing driver
- Pavel Ștefan (1914–1984), Romanian communist politician
- Valentin Ștefan (born 1967), Romanian footballer
- Valentin Ștefan (ice hockey) (born 1944), Romanian ice hockey player
- Vasile Ștefan (born 1948), Romanian footballer
- Viorel Ștefan (born 1954), Romanian politician

== See also ==
- Ștefănescu (surname)
- Ștefănești (disambiguation)
- Ștefania (name)
- Ștefan cel Mare (disambiguation)
- Ștefan Vodă, name of several villages in Romania
