= Achim (name) =

- Pronunciation: [ˈaxiːm]
- Gender: male
- Language: Hebrew in Germany, Austria, Switzerland

Origin
- Meaning: made by Yahweh

Other names
- See also: Joachim

Achim is a male forename and a surname.

== Origin and meaning ==
Achim (German pronunciation: [ˈaxiːm]) is the German short name for Joachim or Jehoiakim (Hebrew meaning "he whom Jehovah has set up"). In the Bible, Achim is mentioned in Jesus' genealogy as the son of Zadok and father of Eliud (Mt 1:14). In this case, Achim means presumably "he will make" or "he will set up" in Hebrew (יקים).

== Name days ==
A name day is the feast day of a saint after whom a person is named.

- 26 July
- 16 August

== Persons with the given name ==
- Achim Albrecht (born 1962), German bodybuilder and professional wrestler
- Achim Benning (born 1935), German actor and director
- Achim Fiedler (born 1965), German conductor
- Achim Freyer (born 1934), German stage director, set designer and painter
- Achim Gercke (1902–1997), German politician
- Achim Glückler (born 1964), German former football player
- Achim Grabowski, German ten-pin-bowler
- Achim Hill (1935–2015), German former rower
- Achim Lippoth (born 1968), German photographer
- Achim Moeller (born 1942), German-American art dealer, art historian, curator, agent, and appraiser
- Achim Müller, German scientist
- Achim Peters (born 1957), German obesity specialist
- Achim Pfuderer (born 1975), German football player
- Achim Reichel (born 1944), German musician, record producer and songwriter
- Achim Richter (born 1940), German nuclear physicist
- Achim Schwarze (born 1958), German author
- Achim Sidorov (born 1936), Romanian former sprint canoer
- Achim Steiner (born 1961), German expert in environmental politics
- Achim Stößer (born 1963), German author and animal rights activist
- Achim Stocker (1935–2009), German president of football club SC Freiburg
- Achim Vogt (born 1970), Liechtenstein former alpine skier
- Achim von Britzke (1920–1945), German soldier
- Achim Warmbold (born 1941), German former rally driver
- Achim Weber (born 1969), German football coach and former player
- Achim (biblical figure) (born Unknown), Son of Zadok, father of Eliud, mentioned in the Gospel of Matthew

== Persons with the surname ==
- Cosmin Achim (born 1995), Romanian footballer
- Florin Achim (born 1991), Romanian footballer
- Honoré Achim (1881–1950), Canadian politician and lawyer
- Sebastian Achim (born 1986), Romanian football player
- Ștefan Achim (1930–2007), Romanian weightlifter and military officer
- Vlad Achim (born 1989), Romanian football player

== See also ==
- Ludwig Achim von Arnim, German poet and novelist
- Hans Achim Litten, German lawyer and Nazi-resistor
