= Ștefănești =

Ștefănești may refer to:

== Places in Moldova ==
- Ștefănești, Florești, a commune in the Florești District, Moldova
- Ștefănești, Ștefan Vodă, a commune in the Ștefan Vodă District, Moldova
- Ștefănești, a village in the Tănătarii Noi Commune, Căușeni District, Moldova

== Places in Romania ==
- Ștefănești, Argeș, a town in Argeș County, Romania
- Ștefănești, Botoșani, a town in Botoșani County, Romania
- Ștefănești, Vâlcea, a commune in Vâlcea County, Romania
- Ștefănești, a village in Suseni Commune, Argeș County, Romania
- Ștefănești, a village in Ileana Commune, Călărași County, Romania
- Ștefănești, a village in Târgu Cărbunești Town, Gorj County, Romania
- Ștefănești, a former village in Ghindari Commune, Mureș County, Romania
- Ștefănești, a former village in Darova Commune, Timiș County, Romania
- Ștefănești, a village in Măciuca Commune, Vâlcea County, Romania
- Ștefăneștii de Jos, a commune in Ilfov County, and its village of Ștefăneștii de Sus, Romania

== Place in Ukraine ==
- Ștefănești, the Romanian name for Stepanivka village, Prylypche, Chernivtsi Oblast

== See also ==
- Ștefan (name)
- Ștefănescu (surname)
- Ștefania (name)
