= Iulian =

Iulian is a masculine Romanian given name. Notable people with the name include:

- Iulian Anca-Trip (born 1995), Romanian footballer
- Iulian Andrei (born 1974), Romanian rugby union player
- Iulian Apostol (born 1980), Romanian footballer
- Iulian Arhire (born 1976), Romanian former professional footballer
- Iulian Bălan (1949–2005), Romanian footballer
- Iulian Baltag (born 1986), Moldovan chess player
- Iulian-Gabriel Bîrsan (1956–2022), Romanian engineer and politician
- Iulian Boiko (born 2005), Ukrainian professional snooker player
- Iulian Bulai (born 1987), Romanian politician
- Iulian Bursuc (born 1976), Moldovan footballer
- Iulian Carabela (born 1996), Romanian professional footballer
- Iulian Chifu (born 1968), Romanian journalist
- Iulian Chiriță (born 1967), Romanian footballer
- Iulian Ciocan (born 1968), Moldovan writer, literary critic and radio show host
- Iulian Cristea (born 1994), Romanian footballer
- Iulian Crivac (born 1976), Romanian footballer
- Iulian Dăniță (born 1975), Romanian footballer
- Iulian Dumitraș (born 1982), Romanian rugby union player
- Iulian Erhan (born 1986), Moldovan professional footballer
- Iulian Filipescu (born 1974), former Romanian footballer
- Iulian Florescu (1943–2011), Romanian ice hockey player
- Iulian Grozescu (1839–1872), Austro-Hungarian Romanian poet and journalist
- Iulian Hartig (born 1998), Romanian rugby union player
- Iulian Levinski (1859–1923), Bessarabian politician
- Iulian Liublinskii (1798–1873), Polish noble, Slav nationalist and Decembrist
- Iulian Mamele (born 1985), Romanian footballer
- Iulian Mihăescu (born 1962), Romanian footballer
- Iulian Mihu (1926–1999), Romanian film director
- Iulian Minea (born 1969), Romanian footballer
- Iulian Miu (born 1976), Romanian footballer
- Iulian Păcioianu (born 1970), Romanian bobsledder
- Iulian Petrache (born 1991), Romanian footballer
- Iulian Pop (1880–1923), Austro-Hungarian and Romanian lawyer and politician
- Iulian Pop (footballer) (1907–?), Romanian footballer
- Iulian Popa (born 1984), Romanian footballer
- Iulian Raicea (born 1973), Romanian sports shooter
- Iulian Roșu (born 1994), Romanian footballer
- Iulian Șerban (1985–2021), Romanian paracanoeist
- Iulian Cristian Ștefan (born 2001), Romanian footballer
- Iulian Teodor Ștefan (born 1980), Romanian footballer
- Iulian Tameș (born 1978), Romanian footballer
- Iulian Teodosiu (born 1994), Romanian sabre fencer
- Iulian Vesper (1908–1986), Austro-Hungarian-born Romanian poet and prose writer
- Iulian Vlad (1931–2017), Romanian government official
- Iulian Vladu (born 1982), Romanian footballer
- Iulian Vladu (politician) (1961–2025), Romanian politician
