= Bardan =

Bardan may refer to:

- Bardan, Iran, a village in West Azerbaijan Province, Iran
- Bardan, Khuzestan, a village in Khuzestan Province, Iran
- Seh Bardan, a village in Iran
- Bardan Monastery, a Buddhist monastery in India
- Ștefan Bardan (1892–?), Romanian Major-General during World War II
