= Ștefănescu =

Ștefănescu is a common family name in Romania. Persons named Ștefănescu include:

- Andrei Ștefănescu, musician
- Barbu Ștefănescu Delavrancea, writer
- Cornelia Ștefănescu, literary critic and historian
- Costică Ștefănescu, footballer
- Eugeniu Ștefănescu-Est, writer
- Eusebiu Ștefănescu, actor
- Florian Ștefănescu-Goangă, psychologist
- George Ștefănescu, painter
- Grigoriu Ștefănescu, geologist
- Melchisedec Ștefănescu, bishop and historian
- Sabba S. Ștefănescu, geophysicist
- Ștefan Ștefănescu, historian

== Others ==
- Gogu Ștefănescu, birth name of boxer Gogea Mitu
- Ioan Ștefănescu, one of the names used by writer Ion Creangă

== See also ==
- Ștefan (name)
- Ștefănești (disambiguation)
- Ștefania (name)
