= Vadász =

Vadász is a Hungarian surname meaning "hunter". Notable people with the surname include:

- Leslie L. Vadász (born 1936), Hungarian-American engineer and manager
- László Vadász (1948–2005), Hungarian chess grandmaster
- Mária Vadász (1950–2009), Hungarian handball player
- Viktor Vadász (born 1986), Hungarian football player

== See also ==
- Vânători (disambiguation)
