= Chifu =

Chifu is a Romanian surname. Notable people with the surname include:

- Iulian Chifu (born 1968), Romanian foreign policy analyst and presidential adviser
- Valter Chifu (born 1952), Romanian volleyball player
