= Ștefan Stoica =

Ștefan Stoica may refer to:

- Ștefan Stoica (footballer) (born 1967), former football midfielder and current manager
- Ștefan Stoica (politician) (1976–2014), Romanian politician
