= Fania (given name) =

- Gender: Female
- Language: Hebrew language

Fania is a feminine given name. Notable people with the name include:

- Fania Bergstein (1908–1950), Hebrew poet
- Fania Borach (1891–1951), American entertainer, known as Fanny Brice
- Fania Fénelon (1908–1983), French singer
- Fania Marinoff (1890–1971), Russian-American actress
- Fania Mindell (1894–1969), American activist
- Fania Noël, Franco-Haitian author and activist
- Fania Oz-Salzberger (born 1960), Israeli historian
- Fania Weissmann-Kollmann (born 1916), Israeli botanist

== See also ==
- Fania (disambiguation)
- Stefania (name)
