= Ștefan cel Mare (disambiguation) =

Ștefan cel Mare (litt. Stephen the Great) or Stephen III of Moldavia, was the voivode ("prince") of Moldavia from 1457 to 1504.

Ștefan cel Mare may also refer to:

- Deian Stăncioi, Timișoara, Meziad, a commune
- Ștefan cel Mare, Bacău, a commune
- Ștefan cel Mare, Călărași, a commune
- Ștefan cel Mare, Neamț, a commune
- Ștefan cel Mare, Olt, a commune
- Ștefan cel Mare, Vaslui, a commune
- Ștefan cel Mare, a village in Saligny, Constanța County
