= Ștefan Petrache =

Moldovan singer (1949–2020)

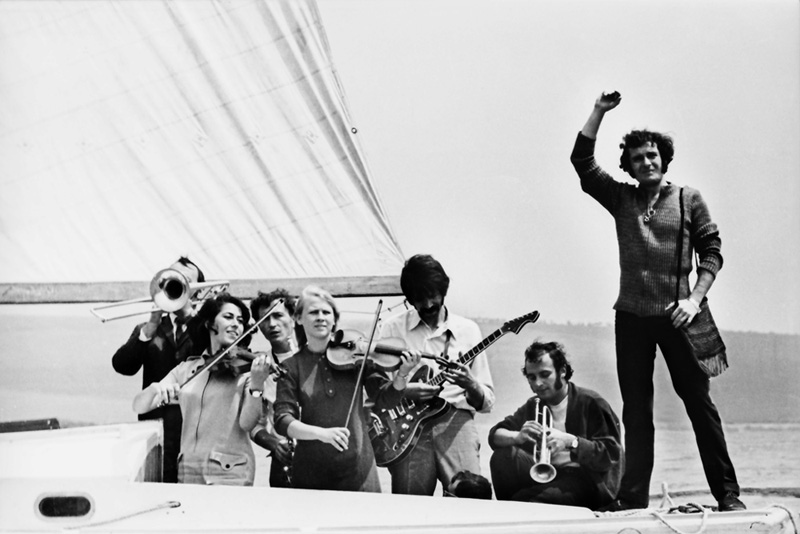
- Petrache (far right) in 1972
- Born: 8 May 1949; Vînători, Moldavian SSR, Soviet Union
- Died: 13 January 2020 (aged 70); Chișinău, Moldova
- Occupation: Singer
- Years active: 1970s–2000s
- Known for: Member of the bands Noroc, Contemporanul, Plai
- Notable work: Eu vin, Adevăruri, Și dacă ramuri bat în geam, În august, Chemarea casei părintești
- Awards: Merited Artist (1986); Medal "For Civic Merit" (1993); Order of Labour Glory (1993); Order of the Republic (2014)

Ștefan Petrache (8 May 1949 – 13 January 2020) was a Moldovan singer who was a member of bands Noroc, Contemporanul, Plai and others.

== Biography ==
Petrache was born in Vînători, Nisporeni.

While studying at the "Gavriil Musicescu" Institute of Arts in Chișinău (1978–1983), Petrache was a soloist with the Symphony and Pop Orchestra of the Teleradio-Moldova (1974–1975), and performed with the vocal-instrumental ensembles Orizont (1977) and Contemporanul (1978–1981). Petrache recorded many popular songs in the Republic of Moldova, such as Eu vin, Adevăruri, Și dacă ramuri bat în geam, În august, and Chemarea casei părintești. He spent thirty-two years on the music scene and on tour.

Petrache appeared in three films: Lăutarii (1971), Code Name: Southern Thunder (1980), and How to Become Famous (1983). In Lăutarii, he had a minor role; in Code Name: Southern Thunder, he portrayed an accordionist; and in How to Become Famous, he played a pop singer.

In 2009, Petrache was diagnosed with diabetes. In February 2019, he suffered a cardiac arrest and was hospitalized in the intensive care unit of a private hospital in Chișinău. He died on January 13, 2019, aged 70.

== Awards ==
In 1986, Petrache was awarded the title of Merited Artist, and in 1993 he received the Medal "For Civic Merit" and the Order of Labour Glory. In 2014 he received the Moldovan Order of the Republic for his contribution to music.
