= Vânători =

Vânători may refer to several places:

== Romania ==
- Vânători, Galați, a commune in Galați County
- Vânători, Iași, a commune in Iaşi County
- Vânători, Mehedinți, a commune in Mehedinţi County
- Vânători, Mureș, a commune in Mureș County
- Vânători, Vrancea, a commune in Vrancea County
- Vânători-Neamţ, a commune in Neamţ County
- Vânători, a village in Mișca Commune, Arad County
- Vânători, a village in Gorbănești Commune, Botoşani County
- Vânători, a village in Ciucea Commune, Cluj County
- Vânători, a village in Pecineaga Commune, Constanţa County
- Vânători, a village in Popricani Commune, Iaşi County
- Vânători, a village in Petrăchioaia Commune, Ilfov County
- Vânători, a village in Lisa, Teleorman Commune, Teleorman County

Vânători may also refer to:

- Vânători (military unit), an elite light infantry unit of the Romanian Army

== Moldova ==
- Vînători, Nisporeni, a commune in Nisporeni district
