= Fania =

Fania may refer to:

- Fania (given name)
- "Fania", 1960 song by Estrellas de Chocolate
- Fania Records, salsa label named after the song
- Fania All-Stars, salsa band named after the label
- Fania (moth)
- Fania language
