= Ștefan Pelmuș =

Romanian artist (born 1949)

Stefan Pelmus
- Ştefan Pelmuş
- Born: August 19, 1949; Valea Calugareasca
- Education: Nicolae Grigorescu Fine Arts Institute in Bucharest
- Notable work: "Totem", "Golem", "Labirint"
- Style: Surreal symbolism
- Awards: Award Salons Museum of Art Chisinau Moldova (2003) Biennale Art Foundation Award Soleil de L’Est, Tours, France (2002) Artists’ Union Prize for picture (1995), First Prize, Biennale of Art Gh.Patrascu, Targoviste, Romania (1994)

Ştefan Pelmuş (born 19 August, 1949) is a contemporary Romanian painter born August 19, 1949, in Valea Calugareasca. Pelmus studied under Ion Salisteanu si Ilie Pavel and is a graduate of the Nicolae Grigorescu Fine Arts Institute in Bucharest where he currently lives and works. A member of the Romanian Artists Association since 1980, Pelmus' latest exhibition was in October 2006 at the Vernescu House in Bucharest.

Pelmus has been exhibited in museums of Romania, France, Germany, Israel, Canada, Austria, Chile, and Brazil, including five solo exhibitions. In 1994 he won the "Gh Patrascu" award and the special award "Gh Theodorescu", and in 1995, the Uniunea Artistilor Plastici din Romania (Union of Romanian Plastic Artists) gave him an award for painting. . He is regarded as one of Romania's foremost contemporary artists.

== Style ==
=== Spiritual heritage ===
Pelmuş' works are deeply anchored in Romanian folklore, but incorporate many pagan ancestral elements as well, dating back as far as pre-Christian beliefs. Composition, iconography and methods are often rooted in the Orthodox Christian faith, a personal belief Pelmuş adheres to. Elements of the Arthurian legend are widely present, and there is a shamanistic aspect to his paintings that aims to transcend preexisting beliefs, shaping a very personal spiritual world. The works are to be interpreted as wards, through which the painter aims to conquer his fear of death.

=== Method ===
Pelmuş works primarily in oils, and prefers canvas and cardboard as a medium. Notable is an Orthodox influence, namely in the rigidity of composition, high intensity of often primary color and backgrounds in silver or gold foil. His technique is traditional for icon painting, starting with foil glued to the canvas and excess removed. A solid coloured background is then added in, after which Pelmuş adds in layers of increasingly detailed elements. Many works also feature Cyrillic signs. In this, his paintings bear a high resemblance to an iconostasis, with a similar attention to placement and hierarchy.

=== Iconography ===
Pelmuş aims to create a world-metaphor, comprising, by symbol, its entire spiritual history. The symbols should be "read as an old manuscript". Many of them are ancient, archetypical and esoteric. Foremost are Christian symbols (with the cross, the ichthys, the golden fund,... ), but shamanistic (the totem, the vision quest, Spirit guides, ...) and esoteric elements from a myriad of cultures are often present.

== Exhibitions ==
A partial list

- "Caminul Artei" art gallery, Bucharest (1980)
- Art Museum of Craiova (1984)
- Düsseldorfe (1985)
- Simeza Gallery, Bucharest (1985)
- Rotterdam (1985)
- Cagnes sur Mer, France (1987)
- Budapest (1987)
- Kosice, Yugoslavia (1988)
- Bad Hamburg, Germany (1990)
- Zoersel, Belgium (1991)
- Horizon Gallery, Bucharest (1992)
- Ankara (1992)
- Paris and Wiesbaden end Nicolae Comănescu(1993)
- London (1994)
- Edegem, Belgium (1997)
- Francophonie Festival, Copenhagen, Denmark (1998)
- Simeza Gallery, Bucharest (1998)
- Gallery Freesia, Dej Simeza Gallery, Bucharest (2001)
- Vernescu House, Bucharest (2004)
- Bistrita; Simeza Gallery, Bucharest; Etalon Gallery, Ramnicu-Valcea (2005)
- Espace Art 101, Paris, France (2006)
- Art Museum, Craiova (2007)
- Gallery C.Brancusi Parliament, Bucharest; Calina Gallery, Timișoara (2008)
- Veroniki Art Gallery, Bucharest; Interference "C.Brancusi" Gallery Palace of Parliament, Bucharest (2010)
- Bucharest Academy Hall Gallery (2012)

=== Group exhibitions ===
- Art House Gallery, Bucharest (1980)
- Art Museum, Craiova; "Nature" exhibition, Hungary (1984)
- EP Gallery, Düsseldorf, Germany; Rotterdam, Netherlands (1985)
- Painting Festival, France; Art Today, Budapest, Hungary (1987)
- IX the Biennale, Kosice, Czechoslovakia (1988)
- Jotzu Arnold Gallery, Bathomburg, Germany (1990)
- Eindhoven, Netherlands; Zoersel, Belgium (1991)
- Art Biennale, Ankara, Turkey; Paris, France (1992)
- Gallery Saint Germain, Paris, France; Wiesbaden, Austria (1993)
- London, UK, Paris France; Gallery Calderon, Bucharest (1994)
- Edegem, Belgium (1997)
- Simeza Gallery, Bucharest (1998)
- Brussels, Belgium; Simeza Gallery, Bucharest; Art Museum Tg. Jiu, Turnu Severin; Bistrita Nasaud (2000)
- Tg Mures, Focsani; Stockholm, Sweden (2001)
- Totem I, Tg Mures; Soleil de L’Est, Tours, France (2002)
- Totem II, Tg. Mures; Soleil de l’Est, Paris and Collioure, France (2003)
- Bacau (2004)
- Tg.Jiu; Deva (2007)
- Art Museum, Constanta; Art Museum, Tulcea (2008)
- Art Gallery, Radauti (2009)
- Hall arr. IX Paris; La Petite Mort Gallery, Ottawa; Edegem, Belgium (2009)
- ICR Rome, Italy; 2011 Brancusi Gallery, Bucharest; Art Museum, Timișoara; Branch Gallery U.A.P., Iasi (2010)
- 9 + 1 Simeza Gallery, Bucharest; Elite Art Gallery, Bucharest; Grounds, Brancusi Exhibition Art Gallery, Bucharest (2012)

== Artworks ==
"Horus". Oil on canvas. 70x50 cm.
