= Fania Noël =

Franco-Haitian writer and activist

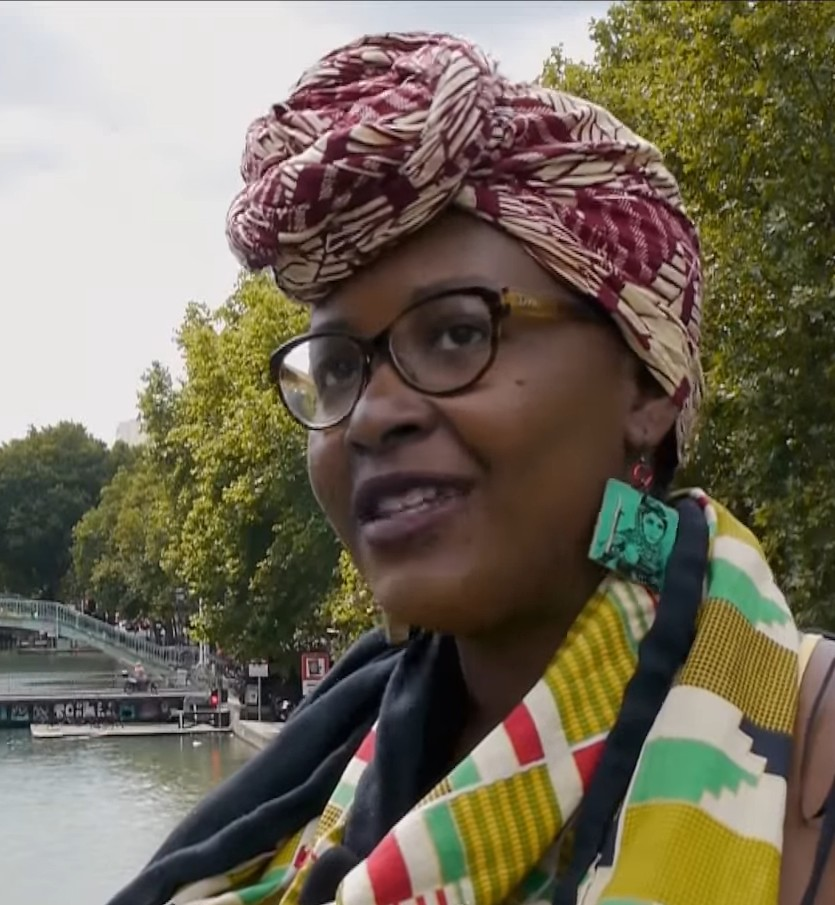

Fania Noël, or Fania Noël-Thomassaint, is a Franco-Haitian author and an activist for Afro-feminist causes.

== Career ==
Noël was born in Haiti, and she grew up in Cergy, France. Noël studied at the Sorbonne, obtaining a master's degree in political science there.

Noël was a co-founder of the publication AssiégéEs, which she became publication director of in 2015.

Noël authored the book Afro-communautaire : Appartenir à nous-mêmes as well as the edited collection Afrofem, both released with the publisher Éditions Syllepse (Fr).

In addition to writing and editing, Noël has also engaged in political and social activist work. Originally an activist with the French Socialist Party, she then moved to the Left Front, before disavowing these institutional affiliations and joining the activist collective Mwasi (which means "girl" or "woman" in Lingala). Noël was also a co-founder of the Black Lives Matter movement in France.
