= Ștefan Chiper =

Romanian serial killer

- Born: Ștefan Remus Chiper; 1976 (age 49–50); Constanța, Romania
- Conviction: Murder x3
- Penalty: Life imprisonment

Details
- Victims: 3
- Span of crimes: 2005–2006
- Country: Romania
- State: Constanța
- Date apprehended: 28 March 2006

Ștefan Remus Chiper (born 1976) is a Romanian serial killer who murdered three people in Constanța from 2005 to 2006 for the purpose of stealing their identities and selling their luxury cars.

He was convicted and sentenced to life imprisonment.

== Early life ==
Little is known of Chiper's early life, aside from the fact that he was born in 1976. As an adult, graduated from the Ovidius University of Constanța as an engineer, lived in Constanța with his wife and child, and involved himself in various business activities. The most notable of these was an unfinished real estate project situated at a beach resort near Costinești. In the past, he also invested in agriculture and a pawn shop, and reportedly owned three properties in Lazu, Eforie and Constanța, all of which he had to sell.

According to Chiper's later statements, he had numerous financial failures and mounting debts to two loan sharks from Mangalia, Stelian Cuşa and Cristian Samir, by the mid-2000s. As he did not want his family to learn of his financial failures and debts, he devised a plan to obtain luxury cars under false pretenses and then sell them after killing their owners.

== Murders ==
Between December 2005 and March 2006, Chiper sought out people willing to sell their luxury calls. Posing as an interested buyer, he would lure them to a rented apartment in Constanța under the pretext of finalizing the transaction and preparing the necessary paperwork. Once inside, he killed the victim, wrapped their face in bandages and the body in foil, and then put the body in the trunk of his car. He would then transport it to the Danube–Black Sea Canal at midnight, where he would weight them down with bags of gravel and throw them into the waters.

On 2 December 2005, Chiper got into contact with his first victim, 30-year-old Pătru Neagu, who wanted to sell a Mercedes-Benz C 200 CDI for 16,000 euros. While Neagu was distracted by something, Chiper grabbed a sledgehammer and hit him once on the head, killing him instantly. He then disposed of the body. Police initially believed that Neagu had fled the country, as he had recently been banned from leaving Romania after being repatriated as an illegal immigrant from somewhere else.

In order to help sell the vehicle, Chiper enlisted the help of 26-year-old rugby player Claudiu Bărbulescu to forge the sales and purchase deed, claiming that he could not do it himself due to his existing debts. Bărbulescu sold the Mercedes-Benz for 12,000 euros and then went to Chiper's apartment two days later to retrieve his promised payment of 1,000 euros. Instead, he was fatally poisoned after Chiper served him a cup of juice laced with carbofuran. Approximately two weeks later, the car's new owner was stopped for a speeding ticket and questioned after authorities noticed that the car belonged to the missing Neagu. As the man did not know who that was and presented them the forged documents, police wrongly assumed that Bărbulescu had sold him the vehicle under false pretenses and then likely fled abroad.

On 27 March 2006, Chiper was at the Constanța Car Fair when he struck up a conversation with 26-year-old Turkish national Arun Omer. He learned that the younger man wanted to sell his silver Mercedes-Benz E220, and offered to buy it. Omer agreed and then accompanied him to the apartment. After a few minutes of conversation, Chiper got up, grabbed the sledgehammer and hit Omer three times, crushing his head in the process.

== Arrest ==
A day after Omer was murdered, his family started an intensive search for him. While his mother alerted all the taxi companies, his father filed a missing persons report to the police, claiming that his son had disappeared after going to sell his car to a man he met at the Car Fair. Just two hours later, police stopped the exact car with Chiper and a woman named Lacramiora Iordache behind the wheel. He was immediately arrested and escorted to the police station, where he readily confessed to the three murders out of fear that Omer's family would lynch him if they had caught him. Several hours later, divers managed to locate the three victims' bodies after Chiper provided detailed instructions on where he had disposed of them.

When queried about his motives, Chiper said that it was all to cover his debts. He also claimed that he poisoned Bărbulescu instead of attempting to bludgeon him because he considered him a friend and that he did not have the courage to hit him on the head. Alarmingly, he also indicated to the officers that he intended to dupe Iordache into selling the car for him, and then kill her in the same way he did with Bărbulescu.

== Trial and imprisonment ==
In the following year, Chiper was ordered to stand trial with increased security measures and additional gendarmes. This was due to the continued threats of reprisal at the hands of Omer's relatives.

He was convicted of three counts of aggravated murder, robbery and forgery, for which he was sentenced to life imprisonment. In addition, all of Chiper's cars and properties were seized, and he was ordered to pay a total of 360,000 lei to the victims' family members. The sentence was later upheld by the Constanța Court of Appeals, making it one of the first life terms to be confirmed in the county following the Romanian revolution.

Since his conviction, Chiper has been detained in a maximum-security facility, having previously been incarcerated at the prisons in Poarta Albă, Tulcea and Slobozia. He has filed several parole applications after serving out the minimum sentence as required per Romanian law, but all of them have been denied, as the judges who heard his appeals ruled that he still posed an active threat to the public.

=== Prison scamming ===
Between March and April 2019, Chiper and another life-sentenced prisoner, Ștefan Niculescu, started bribing superintendent Ioan Silviu Ionele at the Tulcea Penitentiary to bring them SIM cards, phones, Internet modems and other electronic devices. The scheme consisted of Ionele smuggling the phones in via Chiper's brother, Ionuț Alexandru Chiper, after which Chiper and Niculescu would use them to defraud two elderly men by lying to them that their daughters had recently gotten into some sort of traffic accident. Ionele would also resell these phones to other convicts at the penitentiary.

The scheme was uncovered at some point, after which Ionele and Alexandru Chiper were charged for their crimes. Ionele was fired from his position was sentenced to 6 years in prison, while Alexandru Chiper made a plea deal with the prosecution – in exchange for a confession, he was given a more lenient sentence of 2 years and one month imprisonment, which would be suspended.

== See also ==
- List of serial killers by country
