= Ștefănești, Ștefan Vodă =

Ștefănești Штефанешты (Russian) Штефенешть (Ukrainian)
- Village
- Location within Moldova
- Coordinates: 46°26′45″N 29°41′16″E
- Country: Moldova
- District: Ștefan Vodă District

Government
  - Mayor: Ersilia Qatrawi (PLDM)

Area
  - Total: 24.25 km^{2} (9.36 sq mi)
- Elevation: 114 m (374 ft)

Population (2014 census)
  - Total: 1,084
- Time zone: UTC+2 (EET)
  - Summer (DST): UTC+3 (EEST)
- Postal code: MD-4236

Ștefănești is a village in Ștefan Vodă District, Moldova.
