= Ștefan Dascălu =

Romanian immunologist and public health researcher

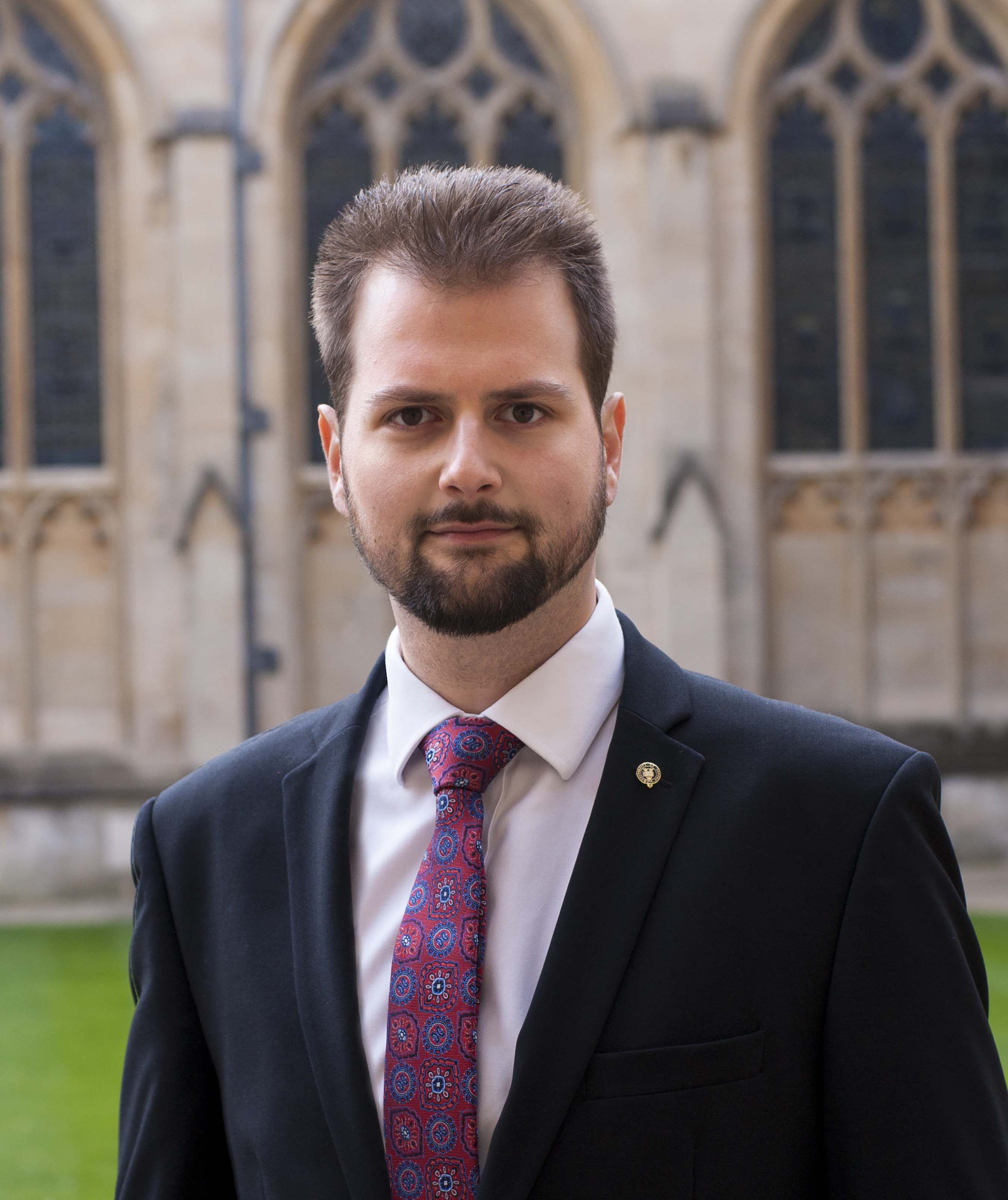
- Education: University College, Oxford (DPhil) St Hugh’s College, Oxford (MA)
- Occupations: Researcher, Healthcare Consultant

Ștefan Dascălu is a Romanian-born immunologist, public health researcher, and science communicator. He is best known for his contributions to immunology, his research on public health, and his role in combating misinformation during the COVID-19 pandemic. Throughout his career, he has worked extensively in both Romania and the UK to improve public health awareness and vaccine acceptance.

== Education ==
Dascălu attended Petru Rareș National College in Suceava, Romania.

Dascălu then enrolled at St Hugh’s College, University of Oxford, where he studied Biological Sciences. He continued with a DPhil in Interdisciplinary Bioscience at University College, University of Oxford. His doctoral research focused on adaptive immune responses to avian influenza viruses, specifically analyzing T and B cell repertoire diversity in response to viral infections. His research aimed to improve the understanding of immune mechanisms in avian species, with the aim of developing better vaccination strategies.

During his doctoral studies, Dascălu worked in collaboration with The Pirbright Institute, a British research center specializing in infectious diseases in livestock. His work contributed to better understanding how different species respond to viral infections and helped inform vaccine strategies for avian influenza.

== Contributions to healthcare in Romania and the UK ==
During the COVID-19 pandemic in Romania and the United Kingdom, Dascălu worked to combat misinformation and vaccine hesitancy. In Romania, he collaborated with the Romanian healthcare authorities, scientific institutions, and religious leaders to promote public health measures. He played a key role in working with the Romanian Orthodox Church, encouraging faith-based communities to adopt preventive measures against COVID-19.

In the UK, he actively engaged with the Romanian expatriate community, helping to dispel vaccine myths and increase trust in scientific recommendations.

== Awards and recognitions ==
- Knighthood of the Order of Cultural Merit (2022) – awarded by the President of Romania for his contributions to public health and science communication.
- Social Impact Award (UKRI) – for his public health work and research contributions related to COVID-19 in Romania and the UK.
- Order of the Holy Brâncoveanu Martyrs – awarded by the Romanian Orthodox Church for his initiatives in promoting health awareness within religious communities.

== Public engagement and media contributions ==
Dr. Dascălu has actively engaged with the media, appearing on Romanian national television, radio, and international news outlets to communicate scientific findings in an accessible way. His insights have addressed topics such as vaccine development, public health measures, and combating misinformation.

He has also delivered talks and written opinion pieces on the future of infectious disease research, the role of science communication in crisis management, and the importance of international collaboration in pandemic response.
