= Ștefan Ströck =

Romanian footballer

Personal information
- Date of birth: 11 February 1901
- Place of birth: Nagyvárad, Austria-Hungary
- Date of death: 15 February 1991 (aged 90)
- Place of death: Oradea, Romania
- Position: Goalkeeper

Youth career
- 1915–1921: Stăruința Oradea

Senior career*
Years	Team	Apps	(Gls)
1921–1923	Stăruința Oradea		
1923–1926	CA Oradea	32	(3)
1926–1927	Fulgerul Chișinău		
1933–1936	CFR Brașov		

International career
1924–1925	Romania	3	(0)
- * Club domestic league appearances and goals

Ștefan Ströck (born 11 February 1901 – 15 February 1991) was a Romanian football player. He competed in the men's tournament at the 1924 Summer Olympics.
