= Omm ol Sakhar, Shadegan =

Omm ol Sakhar ام الصخر
- Village
- Location within Iran
- Coordinates: 30°46′57″N 48°40′44″E
- Country: Iran
- Province: Khuzestan
- County: Shadegan
- Bakhsh: Central
- Rural District: Jaffal

Population (2006)
  - Total: 109
- Time zone: UTC+3:30 (IRST)
  - Summer (DST): UTC+4:30 (IRDT)

Omm ol Sakhar (Persian: ام الصخر, also Romanized as Omm ol Şakhar, Omm oş Şakhar, Omm-os Şakhar, and Omm-os-saxr; also known as Bardān) is a village in Jaffal Rural District, in the Central District of Shadegan County, Khuzestan Province, Iran. At the 2006 census, its population was 109, in 20 families.
