= Ștefan Kroner =

Romanian water polo player

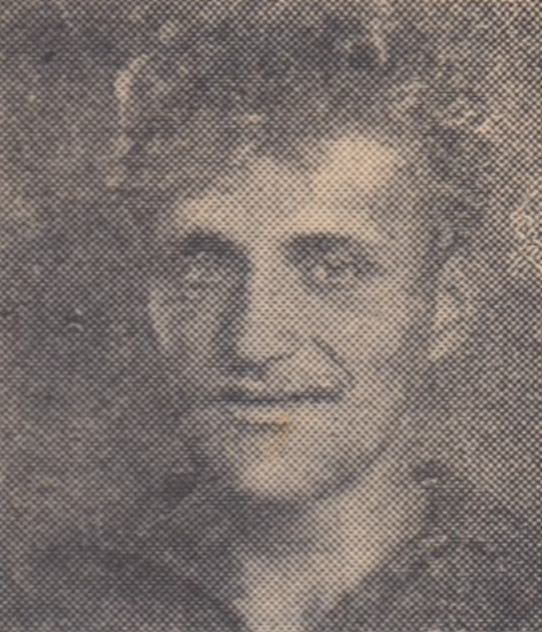
- Pongraț in 1957

Personal information
- Nationality: Romanian
- Born: 30 May 1939 (age 87) Sighișoara, Romania

Sport
- Sport: Water polo

Ștefan Kroner (born 30 May 1939) is a Romanian water polo player. He competed at the 1960 Summer Olympics and the 1964 Summer Olympics.
