= Ștefan Baștovoi =

Moldavian orthodox monk, essayist, poet, painter, novelist and theologian

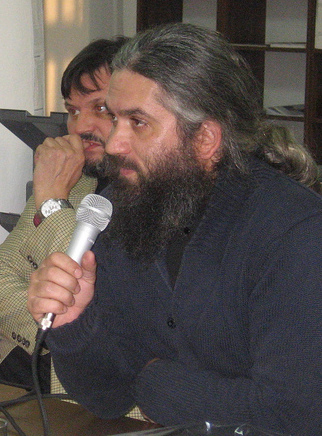

Ștefan Baștovoi (Romanian pronunciation: [ʃteˈfan baʃtoˈvoj]; born 4 August 1976 in Chișinău), best known as Savatie Baștovoi ([saˈvati.e]) is a Romanian orthodox monk, essayist, poet, painter, novelist, theologian and Romanian writer of the Republic of Moldova. He became a member of the Writers' Union of Moldova in 1996. He was also a moderator of a television show.

== Selected works ==
- Elefantul promis, (poem) (1996)
- Cartea războiului, (poem) (1997)
- Peştele pescar (o poveste), (poem) (1998)
- Casa timpului (poem) (1999)
- Idol sau icoană? (2000)
- Ortodoxia pentru postmodernişti (with Nicolae Balotă, Andrei Kuraev and Dumitru Crudu)
- Iepurii nu mor, (novel) (2002; ed. a II-a, 2007)
- Nebunul, (novel) (2006)

== Referenced criticism ==
- Mihai Cimpoi, O istorie deschisă a literaturii române din Basarabia, Ed. Porto-Franco, 1997
- Mircea Cărtărescu, Postmodernismul românesc, Ed. Humanitas, 1999
- Ion Bogdan Lefter, Scriitori români din anii '80–'90. Dicţionar bio-bibliografic, vol. I, Ed. Paralela 45, 2000
