= Achim Schwarze =

German author

Achim Schwarze (born 1958) is a German author. His works include self-help books and are influenced by black comedy and anarchism.
