= Aurel Ștefan =

Romanian fencer

Personal information
- Born: 7 January 1950 (age 76) Bucharest, Romania

Sport
- Sport: Fencing

Aurel Ștefan (born 7 January 1950) is a Romanian fencer. He competed in the team foil event at the 1972 Summer Olympics.
