= Ștefănești, Florești =

Ștefănești
- Commune
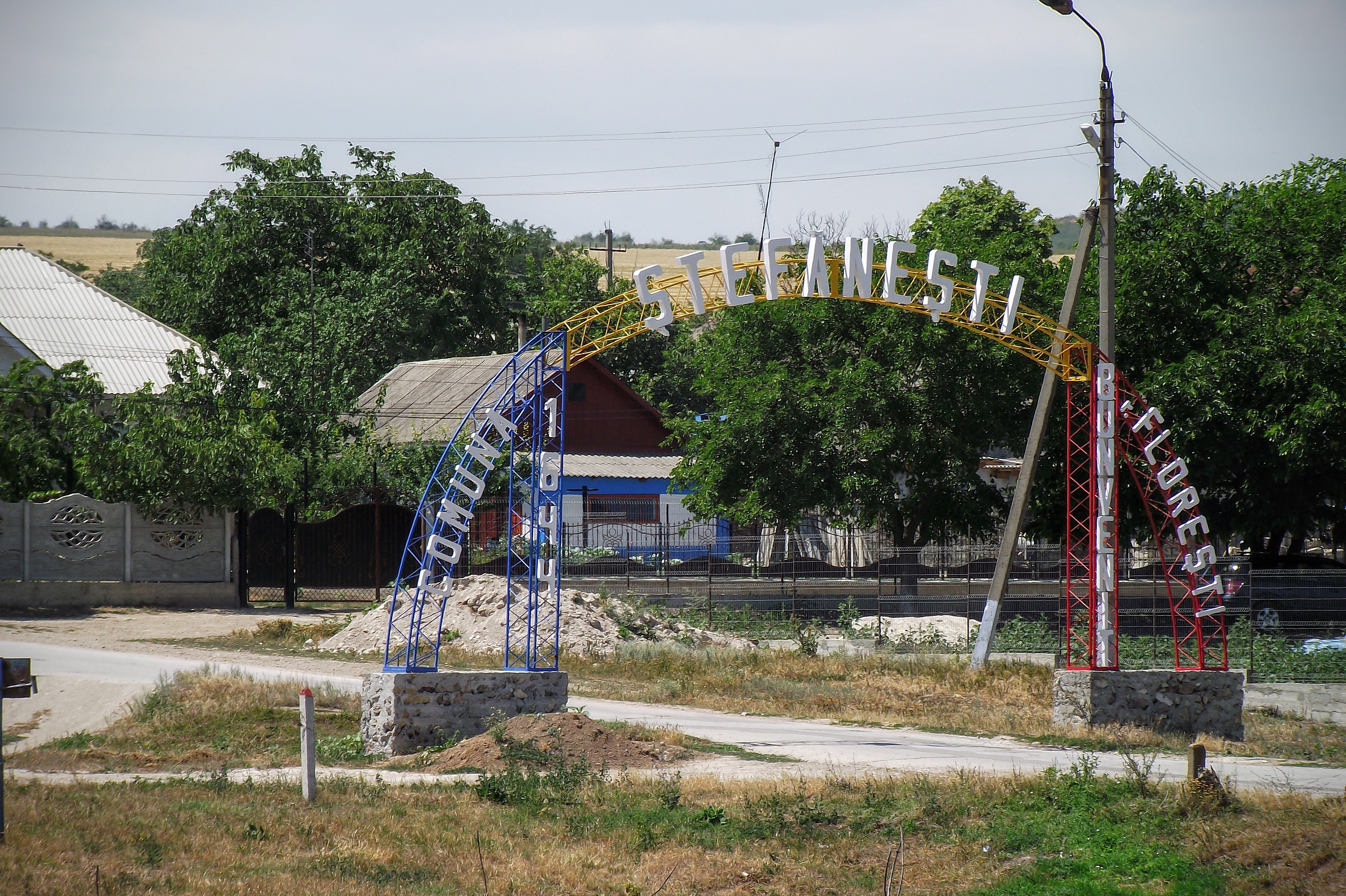

- Location within Moldova
- Coordinates: 47.7327777778°N 28.4394444444°E
- Country: Moldova
- District: Florești District

Government
  - Mayor: Zdraguș Simion (PDM)

Population (2014)
  - Total: 2,335
- Time zone: UTC+2 (EET)
  - Summer (DST): UTC+3 (EEST)

Ștefănești is a commune in Floreşti District, Moldova. It is composed of two villages, Prodăneștii Vechi and Ștefănești.
