= Nicolae Comănescu =

Romanian painter

Nicolae Comănescu (born November 14, 1968, Pitesti, Romania) is a Romanian painter. Described as one of the country's best-known artists of the present day, and one of the founders of the "Rostopasca" art group, one of the most rebellious artistic groups in Romania, which marked the years of transition from socialism to capitalism, he had a solo exhibition at the National Museum of Contemporary Art in the autumn of 2011.
