= Ștefan cel Mare, Olt =

Ștefan cel Mare
- Commune
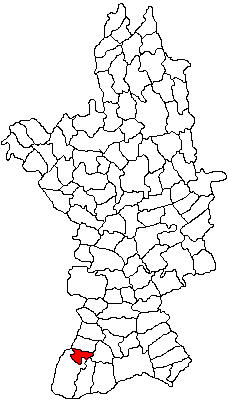
- Location in Olt County

- Location in Romania
- Coordinates: 43.811°N 24.221°E
- Country: Romania
- County: Olt
- Area: 26.58 km^{2} (10.26 sq mi)
- Population (2021-12-01): 1,499
  - Density: 56/km^{2} (150/sq mi)
- Time zone: EET/EEST (UTC+2/+3)
- Vehicle reg.: OT

Ștefan cel Mare is a commune in Olt County, Oltenia, Romania. It is composed of two villages, Ianca Nouă and Ștefan cel Mare.
