= Cornelia Ștefănescu =

Cornelia Ștefănescu (born Cornelia Smădescu, 11 November 1928 – 28 July 2010) was a Romanian literary critic and historian.

== Biography ==
She was born in Caransebeș, Romania, the daughter of officer Traian Smădescu and his wife Emilia (née Pîrvu). She grew up in Teiuș and lived in a house that had belonged to painter Corneliu Baba. She attended primary school (1935–1939) and high-school (1939–1947) in Caransebeș. After graduating high school, she attended The Faculty of Philology of the University of Bucharest (1947–1951). She earned her doctorate in philology with a thesis on the prose writer Spiridon Popescu, which was further elaborated under the guidance of professor George Călinescu.

After finishing her studies, Ștefănescu worked as a librarian (1951–1951) and head of service at the Romanian Academy Library, later becoming a researcher at the George Călinescu Literary Theory and Folklore Institute, known at the time as just "The Literary Theory and Folklore Institute", later becoming head of their sector of comparative literature (1974–1999).

She married engineer Vladimir Ștefănescu in 1953. She suffered an ischemic stroke in 2003, leaving the right half of her body paralyzed, leading to her retirement. In 2008, in honor of her 80th birthday, the Caransebeș Town Hall awarded her an honorary citizenship. Following the event, the Caransebeș Town Hall and the "George Suru" House of Culture released a commemorative volume. She died on July 28, 2010.

== Literary activity ==
Cornelia Ștefănescu made her journalistic debut in 1951 in the magazine Viața Românească, providing articles and studies in the magazine România Literară, Secolul 20, Luceafărul, Manuscriptum, Studii și cercetări de istorie literară și folclor, Revista de istorie și teorie literară, etc. She was a member of the editorial board of Synthesis and Jurnalul Literar.

She made her editorial debut, releasing the monograph Mihail Sebastian (1968), going on to release the volumes Momente ale romanului (1973), Sub scutul soarelui (1985), Ritmuri în piatră (1988); G. Călinescu sau "seriozitatea glumei estetice" (1996), Destinul unei întâlniri. Marcel Proust și românii (2001), and Traiectorii (2003).
