= Ștefan Macovei =

Romanian contemporary sculptor (born 1945)

Stefan Macovei (born 27 December 1945) is a Romanian contemporary sculptor.

== Biography ==
Macovei was born on 27 December 1945 in the village of Neagra, in Neamț County. Living in a mountainous area where specific tools for working out wood were at hand, he began wood carving since his childhood. At the age of 14, he went to Bucharest to continue his studies, attending the Art High School and then the Faculty of Fine Arts.

He received his B.A. Degree in 1968. His aptitudes for expressing his ideas and feelings in drawings which he transposed in 3D pieces of works had made him choose sculpture as his main specialization. He made his apprenticeship and learned the trade of the sculptural monumental art in the studios where the great monuments for the public area were made at that time.

In 1973, he moved to the town of Ploiești, where he opened his own studio making his debut as a sculptor at the biennial exhibitions of the Prahova county.

From that moment, his creative activity has been an ongoing process. He approached both the figurative and non-figurative styles, he made use of all the expression techniques: he drew, he worked in clay and in gyps, he cast in bronze, he carved in wood and stone, adapting these techniques to the theme he dealt with.

He achieved works of various sizes, ranging from studio works to big monuments erected in the public area. Mention should be made of "The Bust of Nichita Stanescu" (bronze, Ploiesti), "The Bust of Constantin Stere" ( bronze, Bucov-Prahova), and "The Statue of Mihai Viteazul "-co-author-(bronze, Ploiesti). Beside participating at the theme exhibitions, he worked in a more private environment, achieving his studio works, such as "Torso "–(bronze, private collection-Germany), "Torso"-(wood, private collection –England), "The New Crown",(bronze), "Prayer",(bronze). It was this personal area, where, free from the restrictions imposed by external orders, he fully expressed his ideas, feelings and talent.

The central message of his art is the achievement of the harmony of the human being with the surrounding nature and the aspiration to a cohabitation of man with all the forms of life on the planet Earth. This cohabitation is considered to be the proper environment of the spiritual evolution of mankind in agreement with the Divine Creator of the Universe. His works are meant to influence people's behavior in such a way.

== Artworks ==
=== Art camps ===
- CASOAIA - Arad (1982) - sculptura monumentala: "TORS", piatra (h=3m)
- RECI - Covasna (1981) - sculptura: "POMUL VIETII", paitra (h=5m)
- Valea Doftanei (1995) - "COMPOZITIE", lemn (h=1,50m)

=== Works of monumental art ===
"MONUMENTUL EROILOR" - Aricesti Rahtivani, Prahova

- Bust Monumental "NICHITA STANESCU" – Parcul Central, Ploiesti
- Monument Funerar "INGER" - Neagra-Neamt
- Monument "THEODOR DIAMANT" - Boldesti-Scaieni -co-author
- Monument Ecvestru "MIHAI VITEAZUL" - Parcul Mihai Viteazul, Ploiesti -co-author
- Bust Monumental "CONSTANTIN STERE" - Parcul C. Stere, Bucov, Prahova
- Bust Monumental "Garabet Ibraileanu" -Parcul Bucov, Prahova
- Bust Monumental "IOAN ALEXANDRU" - donat Bisericii Sf. Andrei, Ploiesti
- Bust "ANTONIE VODA" - Brazi, Prahova
- Monument Funerar "GIMNASTA C. SIMIONESCU" - Cimitirul Bellu, Bucuresti
- Monument "UNITATE" - Scoala "Sf. Vineri", Ploiesti
- Bust "TACHE IONESCU" - Scuar "Biserica Sf. Imparati" - Ploiesti
- "GEORGE ENESCU", "NICHITA STANESCU", "MIHAI EMINESCU", "CONSTANTIN BRANCUSI" - Ambasada Romaniei la Helsinki
- Bust "IENACHITA VACARESCU" - Cartierul Ienachita Vacarescu, Ploiesti
- "TROITA" - donat orasului Breaza
- Bust "Arh. Toma T. Socolescu" - Paulesti, Prahova
- Bust "Constantin Stere" - Muzeul Ion si Constantin Stere, Bucov
- "Portret Suzana Stere-Paleologu" - Muzeul Ion si Constantin Stere, Bucov

=== Commemorative plaques and bronze effigies ===
- "YEHUDI MENUHIN", Sinaia
- "NICOLAE SIMACHE", Cosminele
- "RADU TUDORAN", Blejoi, Prahova
- "VASILE PARASCHIV-LUPTATOR ANTICOMUNIST" - efigie, Ploiesti
- "IOAN GROSESCU-SCRIITOR SI ZIARIST" - portrait, bas relief
- "MUZEUL NICHITA STANESCU", Ploiesti
- "BERNARD POULET-ZIARIST FRANCEZ", Ploiesti
- "NELU si ION DANIELESCU", Ploiesti
- "ION BACIU", Ploiesti
- "ION VOINEA", Ploiesti
- "ION STRATAN-POET", Ploiesti
- "FAMILIA ING. EC. DR. IOAN SI NELY MARZESCU", Ploiesti
- "TROFEUL INTERNATIONAL DE POEZIE NICHITA STANESCU", Ploiesti
