= Achim Peters =

German internist and brain researcher

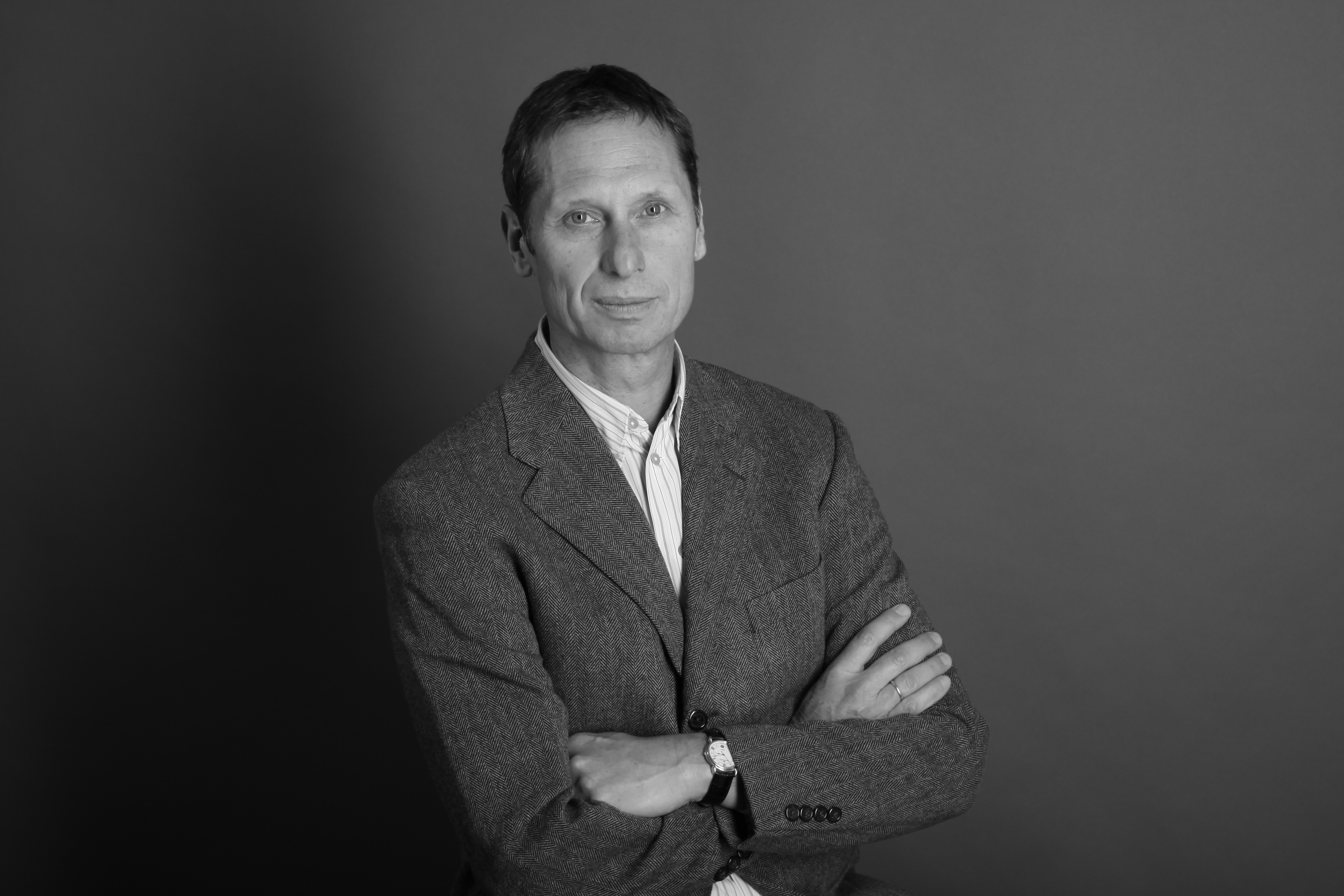
- Achim Peters
- Born: 1957 (age 68–69); Dortmund, West Germany
- Education: University of Lübeck
- Known for: Selfish Brain Theory
- Scientific career
- Fields: internist; brain researcher
- Workplaces: University of Lübeck

Achim Peters (born 1957 in Dortmund) is a German internist and brain researcher. He developed the Selfish Brain Theory.

He has been a professor at the University of Lübeck since 2000 and heads the German Research Foundation (DFG)-funded Clinical Research Group "Selfish Brain: Brain Glucose and Metabolic Syndrome", which has been in existence since 2004.

== Life ==
Peters attended the Humboldt High School in Dortmund until his Abitur in 1976. In the same year, he began studying medicine at the Ruhr University in Bochum; he later moved to the Medical University in Lübeck. In 1977, he won the German National Mathematics Competition of the Donors' Association for German Science. This success was accompanied by a scholarship from the German Academic Scholarship Foundation. In 1983, Peters completed his studies with his license to practice medicine as well as his doctorate (at the Institute of Anatomy, Bochum).

In 1984, Peters joined the Clinic of Internal Medicine at the University of Lübeck. From 1986 to 1989, a DFG postdoctoral fellowship took him to the Hospital for Sick Children in Toronto, Canada, where he conducted research on "Control Theory in Diabetes Mellitus" In the following years, Peters specialized in endocrinology and diabetology within internal medicine. In 1993, he became a senior physician at the Medical Clinic 1 of Internal Medicine at the University of Lübeck.

In 1996 he was habilitated in Lübeck and received the Venia Legendi for Internal Medicine. For his publications in diabetology, he was awarded the Silvia King Prize by the German Diabetes Society. In 2000, he became an associate professor at the University of Lübeck. In 2002, he was promoted to senior physician in charge of endocrinology and diabetology at the University Hospital of Schleswig-Holstein. In 2004, Peters became head of the DFG-funded Clinical Research Group "Selfish Brain: Brain Glucose and Metabolic Syndrome". In 2006, the University of Lübeck appointed him W2 Professor of Internal Medicine/Endocrinology and Diabetology, initially for six years, and in 2009 for life. This was followed in 2008 by admission as a Member of the Faculty of 1000 Biology.

He is the author of several books.

Achim Peters is married and lives in Lübeck.

== Research focus: Selfish brain theory and obesity ==
In 1998 Achim Peters designed the basic model of the Selfish-Brain-Theory and formulated its axioms. In his exposition of the Selfish Brain Theory (2004), he relies on ca. 5000 published data sets of "classical" endocrinology-diabetology and modern neuroscience, but argues mathematically using differential equations as well as systems theory. This is a novel methodological approach in obesity research and diabetology; in this respect, the Selfish-Brain-Theory represents a paradigm shift.

The Selfish Brain theory states that the human brain prioritizes its own comparatively high needs in regulating the organism's energy supply. In this respect, the brain behaves in a "selfish" manner.

In the cerebral hemispheres, the integrating organ of the entire central nervous system, the theory situates the regulatory circuit of an "energy-on-demand" system, with which the ATP concentration of the neurons is kept in equilibrium (homeostasis). This goal is achieved by the allocation (partitioning) of energy from the body.

The Selfish Brain theory represents a further development of existing theories about the organization of the energy supply of the human organism. The further development consists in the fact that in place of a purely passively supplied brain, there is a brain that independently regulates its energy concentrations and assumes a primary position in a hierarchically organized energy metabolism. Blood glucose and body weight control circuits are conceived as a complex regulating food intake, controlled from hypothalamic centres. The "energy-on-demand" system supplying energy to the brain is seen as an entity superior to this area, influencing the control organs of the blood glucose and body weight control circuits. Sprengell et al. 2021 have already shown in two systematic reviews that the predictions of the Selfish Brain theory have been fulfilled in situations where the predictions of the long-held competing theories, which consider the brain as purely passively supplied, have been violated.

The development of obesity can be explained by the Selfish-Brain theory in terms of a supply chain that extends from the environment to the body to the brain as the end-user. Accordingly, obesity can be understood as an energetic "supply chain build-up." As in economic supply chains where goods are left on the shelves when customers do not buy, energy accumulates in the adipose tissue when the brain requires less energy. Reduced average energy consumption by the brain is found, for example, in people who have become accustomed to stress (so-called "stress habituation") and therefore no longer exhibit stress-induced, energy-costly arousal states.

== Awards ==
- 1977 National winner in the German National Mathematics Competition
- 1997 Silvia King Prize of the German Diabetes Society

== Publications ==
=== Monographs ===
- Peters, Achim (1983). Funktionelle Adaptionen in der Morphologie und im Verhalten eines springenden Primaten [Functional adaptations in the morphology and behavior of a jumping primate.] (in German). Bochum: Ruhr-Universität.
- Peters, Achim (1996). Analytisches Design und klinische Anwendung eines lernfähigen Regelsystems für die Pharmakotherapie mit Insulin [Analytical design and clinical application of an adaptive control system for insulin pharmacotherapy.] (in German). Lübeck: Med. Univ. p. 83.
- Schweiger, Ulrich; Peters, Achim; Sipos, Valerija (2003). Essstörungen [Eating disorders.] (in German). Stuttgart; New York: Thieme Verlag. ISBN 978-3-13-128221-7.
- Peters, Achim (2011). Das egoistische Gehirn: Warum unser Kopf Diäten sabotiert und gegen den eigenen Körper kämpft [The selfish brain: Why our brain sabotages diets and fights against our own body.] (in German). Berlin: Ullstein Verlag. p. 330. ISBN 978-3-550-08854-4.
- Peters, Achim (2013). Mythos Übergewicht: Warum dicke Menschen länger leben [The overweight myth: Why corpulent people live longer.] (in German). München: C. Bertelsmann Verlag. p. 271. ISBN 978-3-570-10149-0.
- Peters, Achim (2018). Unsicherheit: Das Gefühl unserer Zeit - Und was uns gegen Stress und gezielte Verunsicherung hilft [Uncertainty: The feeling of our time - And what helps us against stress and targeted insecurity.] (in German). München: C. Bertelsmann Verlag. p. 428. ISBN 978-3-570-10343-2.

=== Editions (publisher, co-editor or co-worker) ===
- Peters, Achim (2004). "The selfish brain: competition for energy resources". Neuroscience and Biobehavioral Reviews. 28 (28) (Neurosci. Biobehav. ed.): 143–180. doi:10.1016/j.neubiorev.2004.03.002. PMID 15172762. S2CID 6883761.
- Peters, Achim; Langemann, D (2009). "Build-ups in the supply chain of the brain: on the neuroenergetic cause of obesity and type 2 diabetes mellitus". Frontiers in Neuroenergetics. 1 (1) (Front Neuroenergetics ed.): 2. doi:10.3389/neuro.14.002.2009. PMC 2691548. PMID 19584906.
- Hitze, B; Hubold, C; van Dyken, R; Schlichting, K; Lehnert, H; Entringer, S; Peters, A (2010). "How the Selfish Brain Organizes its 'Supply and Demand'". Frontiers in Neuroenergetics. 2 (2) (Front Neuroenergetics ed.): 7. doi:10.3389/fnene.2010.00007. PMC 2899523. PMID 20616886.
- Peters, A; Kubera, B; Hubold, C; Langemann, D (2011). "The Selfish Brain: Stress and Eating Behavior". Frontiers in Neuroscience. 5 (5) (Front Neurosci ed.): 47. doi:10.3389/fnins.2011.00047. PMC 3075882. PMID 21519376.
- Peters, A; Kubera, B; Hubold, C; Langemann, D; Zug, S; Wischnath, H; Wilhelm, I; Hallschmid, M; Entringer, S (2012). "The brain's supply and demand in obesity". Frontiers in Neuroenergetics. 4 (4) (Front Neuroenergetics ed.): 4. doi:10.3389/fnene.2012.00004. PMC 3297086. PMID 22408618.
- Peters, A; Kubera, B; Langemann, D (2013). "The corpulent phenotype-how the brain maximizes survival in stressful environments". Frontiers in Neuroscience. 7 (7) (Front Neurosci ed.). doi:10.3389/fnins.2013.00047. PMC 3613700. PMID 23565074.
- Peters, Achim; McEwen, BS (2015). "Stress habituation, body shape and cardiovascular mortality". Neuroscience and Biobehavioral Reviews. 56 (56) (Neurosci Biobehav Rev. ed.): 139–150. doi:10.1016/j.neubiorev.2015.07.001. PMID 26148986.
- Peters, Achim (2017). Biesalski, HK; Bischoff, SC; Pirlich, M; Weimann, A (eds.). Selfish-Brain-Theorie (in German) (Ernährungsmedizin. ed.). Stuttgart: Thieme Verlag. pp. 65–75.
- Peters, Achim (2017). Biesalski, HK; Bischoff, SC; Pirlich, M; Weimann, A (eds.). Regulation der Nahrungsaufnahme [Regulation of food intake.] (in German) (Ernährungsmedizin. ed.). Stuttgart: Thieme Verlag. pp. 90–95.
- Peters, Achim; McEwen, BS; Friston, K (2017). "Uncertainty and stress: Why it causes diseases and how it is mastered by the brain". Progress in Neurobiology. 156 (156) (Progress in Neurobiology ed.): 164–188. doi:10.1016/j.pneurobio.2017.05.004. PMID 28576664. S2CID 286501.
- Peters, Achim; Reisch, C; Langemann, D (2018). "LTP or LTD? Modeling the Influence of Stress on Synaptic Plasticity". eNeuro. 5 (1) (Eneuro ed.). doi:10.1523/ENEURO.0242-17.2018. PMC 5898787. PMID 29662939.
- Peters, Achim (2020). Egle, UT; Heim, C; Strauß, B; von Känel, R (eds.). Die Selfish-Brain-Theorie: Wie Stress die Körperform verändert, Diabetes verursacht und die Mortalität erhöht [The Selfish Brain Theory: How stress changes body shape, causes diabetes, and increases mortality.] (in German) (Psychosomatik – neurobiologisch fundiert und evidenzbasiert ed.). Stuttgart: Kohlhammer Verlag. pp. 193–200.
- Hartwig, M; Peters, A (2020). "Cooperation and Social Rules Emerging from the Principle of Surprise Minimization". Frontiers in Psychology. 11 (11) 606174 (Front Psychol. ed.). doi:10.3389/fpsyg.2020.606174. PMC 7858259. PMID 33551917.
- Sprengell, M; Kubera, B; Peters, A (2021). "Brain More Resistant to Energy Restriction Than Body: A Systematic Review". Frontiers in Neuroscience. 15 (15) (Front Neurosci ed.). doi:10.3389/fnins.2021.639617. PMC 7900631. PMID 33633541.
- Sprengell, M; Kubera, B; Peters, A (2021). "Proximal Disruption of Brain Energy Supply Raises Systemic Blood Glucose: A Systematic Review". Frontiers in Neuroscience. 15 (15) 685031 (Front Neurosci ed.). doi:10.3389/fnins.2021.685031. PMC 8264130. PMID 34248487.
