= Ștefan Balaban =

Romanian general

Ștefan Balaban (20 April 1890 – 31 May 1962) was a Romanian brigadier general during World War II.

After becoming an officer in the Romanian Army, he advanced to lieutenant colonel in 1930 and colonel in 1938. Balaban was awarded the Order of the Star of Romania, Officer class in June 1940. He served as Chief of Staff 6th Corps Area in 1941 and Commanding Officer Infantry 1st Fortress Division in 1942. In March 1943 he was promoted to brigadier general, and then served as Commanding Officer of the 6th Infantry Brigade from May 1943 to September 1944. For a month after that, Balaban was the General Officer Commanding 6th Infantry Division, and he went into reserve in 1947.

After the Communist regime came to power he had to suffer, but after a while he regained his pension and could provide for his large family (he had 10 children).
