= Achim Lippoth =

German photographer and film director

Achim Lippoth (born 1968 in Ilshofen, West Germany) is a German photographer and film director. He is considered the most prominent photographer of children, and became known for using child models to stage scenes from everyday life.

== Biography ==
Lippoth was born in Ilshofen, Germany in 1968 and lives in Cologne. In 1985–86, he studied at Byrom College Manchester in Great Britain. In from1986-92, he studied art at the University of Cologne. In 1992, he became a freelance photographer based in Germany. In 1995, he established kid’s wear Magazine. He has been a film director with the commercial film production company Markenfilm in Germany since 1998.

=== Allegations of child sexual abuse ===
In May 2022, Die Zeit reported that Cologne prosecutors charged Lippoth with twelve cases of severe sexual abuse of six children, and with the possession of child pornography. He will stand trial beginning on 31 May 2022, after nine months of pre-trial detention.

The cases of alleged abuse reportedly date from 1999 to 2021. The abuse allegedly occurred during extended shooting trips, on which the children accompanied Lippoth unaccompanied, sometimes sleeping in his hotel room. According to Die Zeit, three criminal complaints against Lippoth since the 1990s were not followed up by police, and investigations only began after the fourth complaint in 2021.

== Work ==
Lippoth mainly photographed children with an innocent depiction of childhood. He represents "diverse facets of childlife: its spontaneity, camaraderie, playfulness, and of course, mischief”. Lippoth focuses on the complexities and contradictions of modern childhood. By using child models to stage scenes from everyday life, he casts normal activities with a complex sub-text, questioning the viewer's innocence and complicity.

Edelman's Gallery described Lippoth's work as “drawing heavily from art and photographic history, [he] creates images which have a haunting beauty that is both humorous and poignant, as children take center stage within his elaborate sets. The resulting imagets are arresting, using seductive colors to dramatize events, memories and emotions from our collective past”.

Lippoth's work has been published in Blackbook, New York Times Magazine, Details, Stern, Vogue Italia and Vogue Nippon. He shot, among many other works, a series of images for a campaign against child sexual abuse by the NGO Innocence in Danger.

He has also worked for advertising agencies including Abbott Mead Vickers BBDO, DDB Worldwide, Grey Worldwide, Jung von Matt, Leo Burnett Worldwide, Lowe Worldwide, Ogilvy & Mather, and others. Among his customers are such names as Audi, AOL, Lego, McDonald's, Lexus and Lufthansa.
