= Ștefan Demici =

Romanian rugby union player and coach

- Full name: Ștefan Demici
- Born: 4 August 1975 (age 51) Bucharest, Romania
- Height: 1.78 m (5 ft 10 in)
- Weight: 98 kg (15 st 6 lb; 216 lb)
- Occupation: Team Manager

Rugby union career
- Position: Hooker
- Current team: Dinamo București
Senior career
Years	Team	Apps	(Points)
?–2006	Dinamo București		
- Correct as of 10 March 2018
Provincial / State sides
Years	Team	Apps	(Points)
1998–2003	Dinamo București	14	(20)
International career
Years	Team	Apps	(Points)
1998–2001	Romania	6	(0)
- Correct as of 10 March 2018
Coaching career
- Years: Team
- 2009–?: Dinamo București

Ștefan Demici (born 4 August 1975) is a Romanian former rugby union football player and coach. He played as a hooker. He also played for Romania's national team, the Oaks, making his international debut in a match against the Argentinian Los Pumas.

Demici is the current team manager of Dinamo București.

== Club career ==
Ștefan Demici played his entire career for professional SuperLiga club, Dinamo București. He also played with Dinamo in the European Rugby Challenge Cup competition.

== International career ==
Ștefan Demici was selected for 4th Rugby World Cup in 1999, but did not play any matches.

== Honours ==
Dinamo București

- SuperLiga: 8 trophies
- Romanian Cup: 5 trophies
