= Ștefan C. Hepites =

Romanian physicist and meteorologist

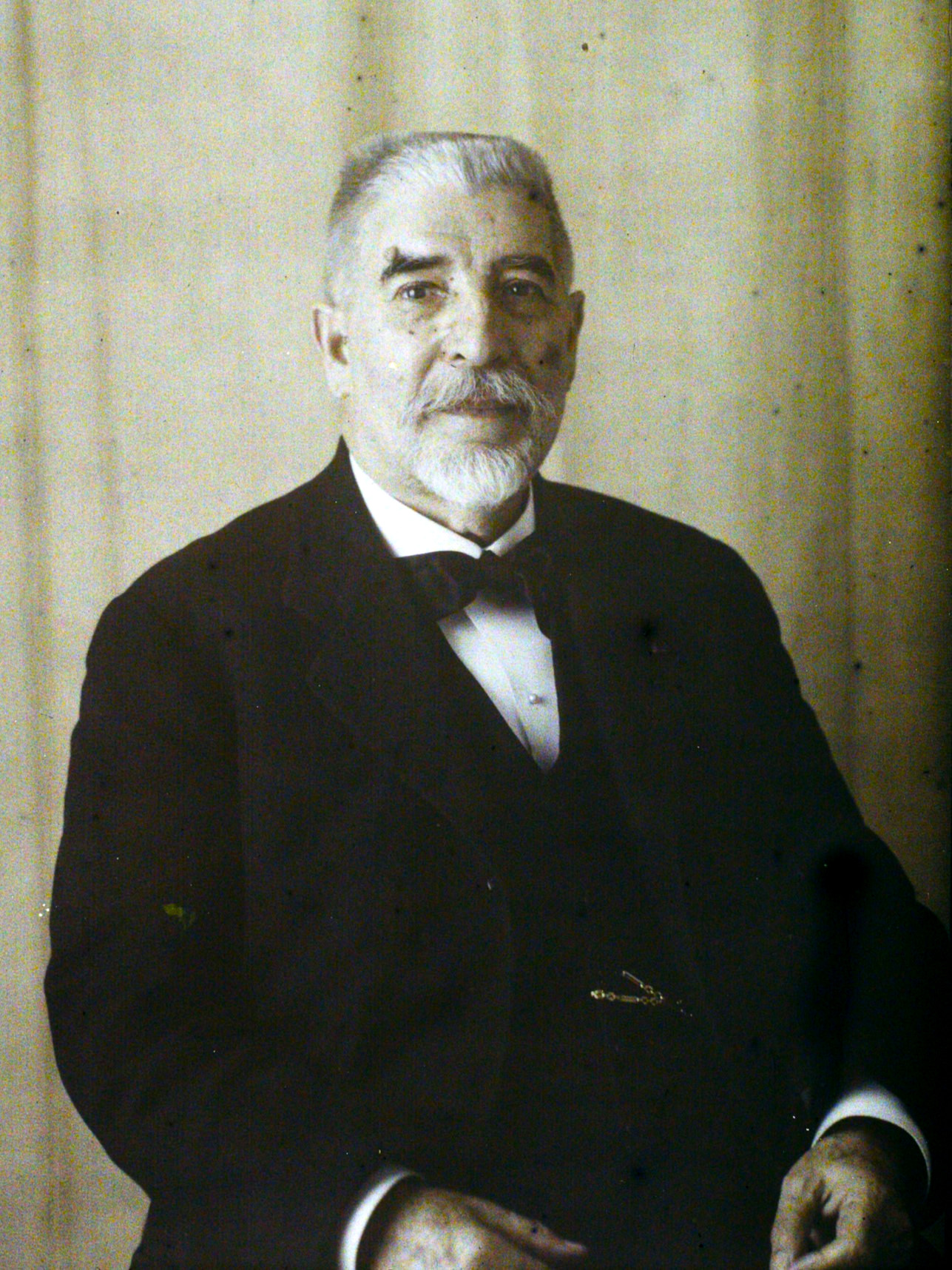
Autochrome portrait by Auguste Léon, 1920

Ștefan C. Hepites (February 1851 – September 1922) was a Romanian physicist and meteorologist.

He was elected a full member of the Romanian Academy in 1902.
