= Iulian Cristian Ștefan =

Romanian footballer

Iulian Ștefan
Personal information
- Full name: Iulian Cristian Ștefan
- Date of birth: 1 June 2001 (age 25)
- Place of birth: Bucharest, Romania
- Height: 1.87 m (6 ft 2 in)
- Position: Central midfielder

Team information
- Current team: Unirea Constanța

Youth career
- –2020: FCSB

Senior career*
Years	Team	Apps	(Gls)
2020–2021	Pandurii Târgu Jiu	3	(0)
2021–2022	Academica Clinceni	9	(1)
2022–	Unirea Constanța	0	(0)
- * Club domestic league appearances and goals as of 4 October 2022

Iulian Cristian Ștefan (born 1 June 2001) is a Romanian professional footballer who plays as a central midfielder for Liga II side Unirea Constanța.

== Club career ==
=== Academica Clinceni ===
He made his league debut on 26 May 2021 in Liga I match against CS Universitatea Craiova.

== Career statistics ==
=== Club ===
As of match played 16 May 2022

Appearances and goals by club, season and competition
Club	Season	League			National Cup (Note: Includes Cupa României)		Europe		Other (Note: Appearances in Supercupa României)		Total	
Club	Season	Division	Apps	Goals	Apps	Goals	Apps	Goals	Apps	Goals	Apps	Goals
Pandurii Targu Jiu	2020–21	Liga II	3	0	0	0	0	0	0	0	3	0
Academica Clinceni	2020–21	Liga I	1	0	0	0	0	0	0	0	1	0
Academica Clinceni	2021–22	Liga I	8	1	0	0	–		–		8	1
Academica Clinceni	Total		9	1	0	0	–	–	–	–	9	1
Career Total			12	1	0	0	0	0	0	0	12	1
