= Ștefan Stoica (politician) =

Romanian politician

Ştefan Stoica (1976 – 4 February 2014) was a Romanian politician. He was a member of the Senate from 2012 to 2014.

A physician by profession, he was a member of the Democratic Liberal Party before switching to the People's Party – Dan Diaconescu, and he was elected while belonging to that party, for a seat in Ialomița County. In October 2013, he defected to the Social Democratic Party.

Stoica died of cancer at the age of 37.
