= Iulian Teodor Ștefan =

Romanian footballer

Iulian Ștefan
Personal information
- Full name: Iulian Teodor Ștefan
- Date of birth: 24 July 1980 (age 46)
- Place of birth: Bucharest, Romania
- Height: 1.80 m (5 ft 11 in)
- Position: Midfielder

Senior career*
Years	Team	Apps	(Gls)
1997–1998	Midia Năvodari		
1998–2000	Farul Constanța	6	(0)
2001–2006	Pandurii Târgu Jiu	138	(29)
2006–2008	UTA Arad	8	(1)
Total		152	(30)
- * Club domestic league appearances and goals as of 17 July 2018

Iulian Teodor Ştefan (born 24 July 1980) is a Romanian former football midfielder. In his career Ștefan played mainly for Pandurii Târgu Jiu, but also for teams such as Farul Constanța or UTA Arad.

== Honours ==
Pandurii Târgu Jiu

- Liga II: 2004–05
