= Ștefan Achim =

Romanian weightlifter

Ștefan Achim (1930–2007) was a Romanian weightlifting coach, weightlifter and military officer, the last rank held by him in the army was colonel.

He was a graduate of the first course for weightlifting coaches, in 1950. As an athlete he was first enlisted in the sports club "Monitorul Oficial" from Bucharest and was subsequently transferred to the club Clubul CCA Steaua.

While wearing the military club's colors, Stefan Achim has won in 1951, at the 8th edition of the National Weightlifting Championship, his first title as a champion and national record holder in 56 kg weight category, whilst being the first Romanian to ever use the lifting technique called "hockey".

For 30 years he was the coach of the CCA Steaua Club and for over 15 years the national team's coach. Thus, Stefan Achim contributed greatly to Romanian sport history and helped Romanian weightlifters to showcase their skills in and outside Romania, many of them were to become future champions. Among the European, world and Olympic record holders are Nicu Vlad (4 times Olympic record breaker), Silviu Cazan, Ilie Dancea și Lazăr Baroga.

The CCA Steaua weightlifting team led by him has won over 20 national championships. Considered to be among the world's best weightlifting coaches, Stefan Achim and his national team athletes have won a great number of medals at the 1984 Summer Olympics in Los Angeles. In the same year, at the World Weightlifting Championships, his team won first place and won a total of 21 medals for Romania.

Between 1960 and 1964 he was the secretary of the Romanian Weightlifting Federation and he was awarded "Honored Coach" title. In the year 2000 he was awarded the national medal "Serviciul Credincios I".

Along with Ilie Dancea, he laid the foundation of the weightlifting section of the Steaua Club by bringing in athletes from the Constanta-based Navy. Many of them have later on become national record holders: Silviu Cazan, Eremia Delca and Atila Vasarhely. They have become versed in the "hockey" lifting technique that Stefan Achim used to break a new national record in 1951 at the 82.5 kg category.
