= Stefania (name) =

- Pronunciation: Sh-te-pha-nee-ah
- Gender: Female

Origin
- Origin: Old Greek
- Meaning: Crowned

Other names
- Related names: Stefánia (used in Hungarian), Stephanie, Stefa (also used in Polish), Stepania (also used in Russian). Other English forms include the shortenings Stef, Steph, Stepha, and Stephi, the familiar forms Fanny (also used in French), Steffi (also used in German, and Greek), Steffie, Stefi, Stevey, Stevi, and Stevie, and the spelling variants Stefanie (also used in French, and German). Forms used in foreign languages include the Spanish Estebana, the Portuguese Estefana, the Spanish Estefani, the Spanish Estefanía, the Greek Stamatios, the Greek Stefana, the Russian Stefanida, the Polish Stefcia, the Czech and Polish Stefka, the Macedonian Stefanija, the Russian Stepa, the Russian Stepanida, the Russian Stepanyda, the German Stephanine, the Russian Stesha, the Russian Steshka, the French Stéphanie. The familiar forms Faina (Russian), Fania (Italian), and Panya (Russian), and the spelling variant Stefani (German and Italian) are other foreign forms.

Stefania [in all languages except for Italian and Polish pronounced like Ste-pha-nee-ah] is a female name in Belarusian, Bulgarian, Croatian, Czech, Greek, Stefánia Hungarian, Italian, Romanian, Polish, Serbian, Macedonian, Slovak, Slovene, Ukrainian and Russian, originating from Old Greek meaning crowned or the winning.

== People ==
- Stefanía Aradillas (born 1994), Mexican softball player
- Stefania Ascari (born 1980), Italian politician
- Stefania Barr (born 1994), American actress and musician
- Stefania Belmondo (born 1969), Italian cross country skier
- Stefania Berton (born 1990), Italian pair skater
- Stefania Calegari (born 1967), Italian competitive ice dancer
- Stefanía Cora (born 1989), Argentine politician
- Stefania Dovhan, Ukrainian-American soprano
- Stefania Elfutina (born 1997), Russian competitive sailor
- Stefanía Fernández Krupij (born 1990), 2009 Miss Universe, a Venezuelan of Ukrainian and Galician descent
- Stefania Follini (born 1961), Italian interior designer who holds the world record for the longest period in isolation by a woman
- Stefania Górska (1907–1986), Polish actress, composer, singer and dancer
- Stefania Grodzieńska (1914–2010), Polish writer, stage actress and satirist
- Stefania Jabłońska (1920–2017), Polish physician and professor emeritus
- Stefania Liberakakis (born 2002), Greek/Dutch singer and actress
- Ștefania Mărăcineanu (1882-1944), Romanian physicist
- Stefania Podgórski, (1921–2018), Polish righteous among the nations
- Stefania Prestigiacomo (born 1966), Italian politician, member of the Chamber of Deputies of Italy
- Stefania Sandrelli (born 1946), Italian actress
- Stefania Siedlecky (1921 - 2016). Australian medical doctor
- Ștefania Stănilă, (born 1997), Romanian gymnast
- Stefania Stanuta (1905-2000), Belarusian actress
- Stefania Ulanowska, Belarusian ethnographer and folklorist
- Ștefania Vătafu (born 1993), Romanian footballer
- Stefania Spampinato (born 1982), Italian actress

== Places ==
- Stefania, Greater Poland Voivodeship (West-central Poland)
- Stefania, Łódź Voivodeship (Central Poland)

== Art ==
- "Stefania", song by Ukrainian folk-rap group Kalush Orchestra

== Name days ==
- December 27 in Greece
- December 26 in Italy
- September 18 in Poland
- November 24 in Russia
- November 28 in Hungary
- December 26 in Czech Republic
- December 27 in Romania
- December 27 in Bulgaria

== See also ==
- Stephanie
- Ștefan (name)
