= Vînători, Nisporeni =

Vînători
- Village
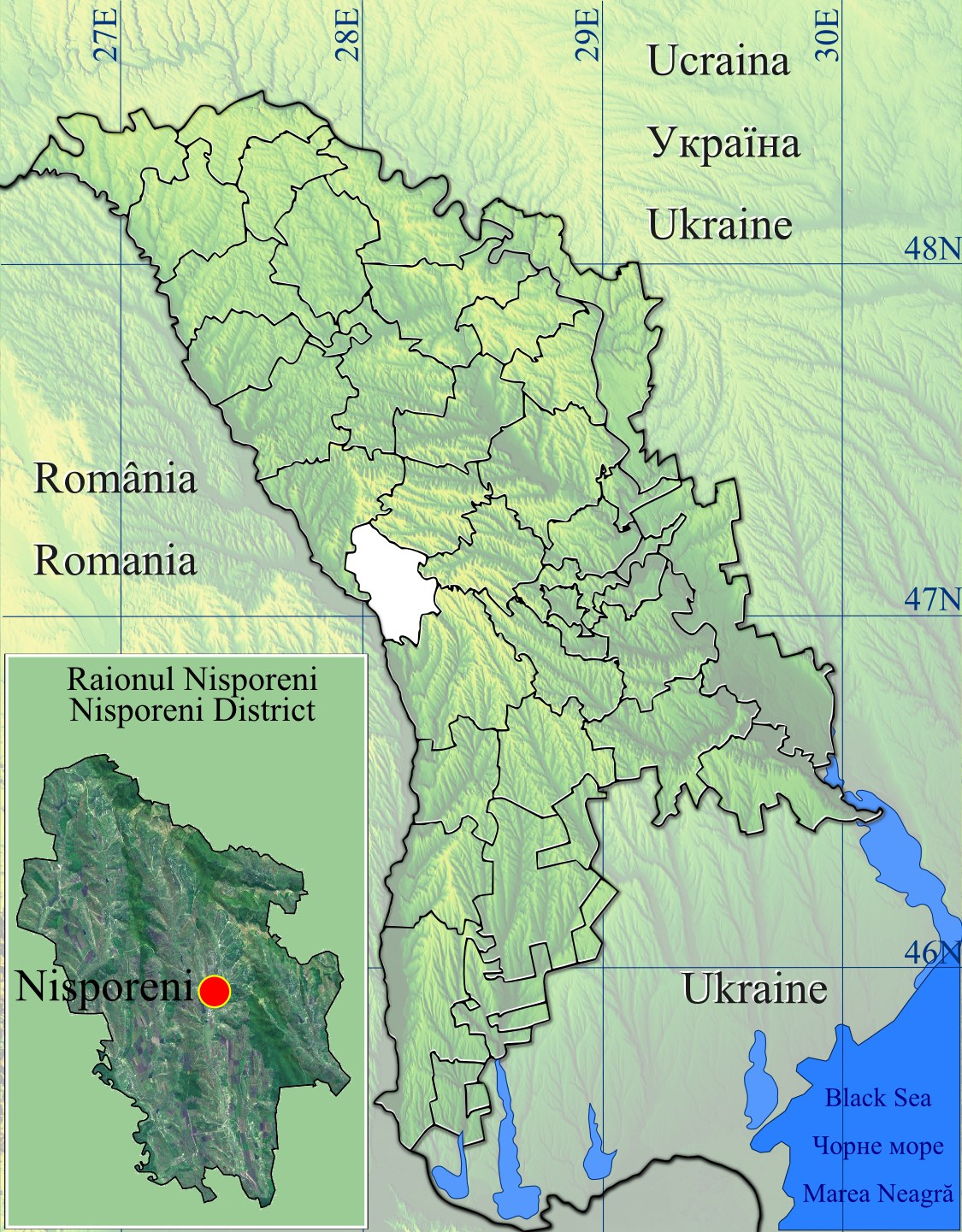
- Location within Nisporeni
- Coordinates: 47°11′12″N 28°6′8″E
- Country: Moldova
- District: Nisporeni District

Government
  - Mayor: Ecaterina Lazăr (PDM)

Population (2014 census)
  - Total: 919
- Time zone: UTC+2 (EET)
  - Summer (DST): UTC+3 (EEST)
- Postal code: MD-6440

Vînători is a village in Nisporeni District, Moldova.
