= Iulian Chifu =

Romanian journalist

- Born: 28 July 1968 (age 57); Iași, Romania

Iulian Chifu (born 28 July 1968) is a Romanian foreign policy analyst and former presidential adviser.

== Biography ==
Iulian Chifu was born on 28 July 1968 in Iași, Romania.

Chifu was an advisor to the former President of Romania Traian Băsescu on strategic issues and international security.

He published a book, Gândire Strategică ("Strategic Thinking"), in 2013.

In May 2015, Chifu became one of the Romanian people sanctioned by Russia during the Russo-Ukrainian War.
