= Ștefan Bardan =

Romanian general (1892–after 1947)

Ștefan Bardan (14 September 1892 – ?) was a Romanian major general during World War II.

After becoming an officer in the Romanian Army, he advanced to lieutenant colonel in 1933 and colonel in 1938. He served as commanding officer 11th Regiment in 1941, and later that year became commandant of the Infantry Instruction Center. In October 1941, Bardan was awarded the Order of Michael the Brave, 3rd class. In March 1943 he was promoted to brigadier general, after which he served as Chief of Staff of the Romanian 4th Army (under the command of lieutenant general Gheorghe Avramescu) from June to December of that year. Bardan then became general officer commanding of the 5th Infantry Division, which he led until September 1944. Subsequently, he was made Vice Chief of the General Staff, and went into reserve in July 1945. After being promoted to major general in August 1946, he retired in September 1947.

The last part of his life he lived in Balotești, Ilfov County, where he had received a property on a hill which, in time, was called by the villagers "La Generalu'" (At the General). A street on this hill is now named after him.
